In sports, the terms Cinderella, "Cinderella story", and Cinderella team are used to refer to situations in which competitors achieve far greater success than would reasonably have been best expected. Cinderella stories tend to gain much media and fan attention as they move closer to the tournament final game.

The term comes from the well-known European folk tale of Cinderella, which embodies a myth-element of unjust oppression and triumphant reward, when the title character's life of poverty is suddenly changed to one of remarkable fortune. In a sporting context the term has been used at least since 1939, but came into widespread usage in 1950, when the Disney movie was released that year, and in reference to City College of New York, the unexpected winners of the NCAA Men's Basketball championship also that year. The term was used by Bill Murray in the 1980 movie Caddyshack where he pretends as the announcer to his own golf fantasy: "Cinderella story. Outta nowhere. A former greenskeeper, now, about to become the Masters champion." Referring somewhat inaccurately to the plot details of the classic Cinderella story, the media will debate whether the given "Cinderella" team or player will "turn into a pumpkin", i.e. fail to win the prize and then return to its former obscurity. In the fairy tale, it was the carriage that turned into a pumpkin at midnight, not Cinderella herself. Another popular term is "strike midnight", when a Cinderella team does finally get beaten.

Prior to the widespread use of Cinderella in this way, the more common term for unexpected and dramatic success was Miracle, as in the "Miracle Braves" of 1914, the "Miracle on Grass" in 1950, the "Miracle of Coogan's Bluff" in 1951, the "Miracle Mets" of 1969, and the "Miracle on Ice" in 1980.

Cinderella teams are also referred to as a surprise package or surprise packet, and their success would be termed a fairy-tale run. A related concept is the giant-killer, which refers to a lesser competitor who defeats a favorite, reflecting the story of David and Goliath. In Soviet sport, particularly team sports like football and hockey, there appeared a term Thunder to the Dominant [teams] (Groza avtoritetov) that referred to underdog, often a strong mid-table team, of which the dominant teams were afraid. The title is still in use in the post-Soviet period and sometimes is given to "dark horse" teams which manage to win a major tournament. There was an official sports award that was introduced by the Soviet sports weekly "Sportivnaya Moskva" in the 1970s and 1980s for football and hockey top competitions awarded to teams that managed to take away the biggest number of points from the last season top-three placed teams.

Examples of "Cinderellas"
Many teams are considered "Cinderella teams" when they seemingly overachieve. For example, the Tampa Bay Rays and the Arizona Cardinals went all the way to their respective leagues' championships in 2008, and the Vegas Golden Knights went all the way to the 2018 Stanley Cup Finals by winning the Clarence Campbell Bowl in 2018. In all three cases, these teams only “turned into a pumpkin” in the end. This list is confined mostly to "Cinderella teams" that won championships. A list of Cinderella teams that did not win their championship is below this one.

Alpine skiing
 Hansjörg Tauscher at 1989 World Championships - Tauscher best career achievement in the World Cup was third place in a downhill race in Garmisch in January 1992, but he surprisingly won the downhill race at the WC 1989 in Vail.
 Janica Kostelić at 2002 Winter Olympics – After achieving 8th place in only one event at the 1998 Winter Olympics, Kostelić suffered a very serious knee injury in December 1999 that threatened to end her career. Having been out of commission for nearly a year, Kostelić returned to win the 2001 Alpine Skiing World Cup. She would continue and bring home 4 medals out of 5 sporting competitions: Alpine skiing events at 2002 Winter Olympics, including becoming the first woman in history of Alpine skiing to win 3 gold medals during a single Olympics.

American football

National Football League
 1968 New York Jets – The American Football League (AFL) champion Jets, led by quarterback Joe Namath, defeated the heavily favored National Football League (NFL) champion Baltimore Colts 16–7 in Super Bowl III. Namath had shockingly guaranteed a Jets win before the game.
 1969 Kansas City Chiefs – The Chiefs lost starting QB Len Dawson and backup Jacky Lee to injury. But third-stringer Mike Livingston, along with the team's defense, orchestrated a five-game winning streak. Dawson returned and the Chiefs beat the Jets and Raiders in the AFL playoffs and then knocked off the heavily favored Minnesota Vikings in Super Bowl IV.
 1980 Oakland Raiders – The Raiders became the first Wild-Card playoff team to win the Super Bowl, defeating the Philadelphia Eagles 27–10 in Super Bowl XV.
 1997 Denver Broncos—The Broncos were the first AFC team since the then-Los Angeles Raiders at Super Bowl XVIII to win a Super Bowl, defeating the defending Super Bowl champion Green Bay Packers 31–24 at Super Bowl XXXII and winning their first Super Bowl in franchise history.
 1999 St. Louis Rams – After losing starting quarterback Trent Green in the preseason to a torn ACL, many suspected the Rams' season was over. Kurt Warner, an undrafted quarterback who formerly worked as a grocery store clerk, led the Rams to a 13–3 record, their first winning record in 10 seasons. After defeating the Minnesota Vikings and Tampa Bay Buccaneers in the NFC playoffs, the Rams captured their first Super Bowl championship by defeating the Tennessee Titans 23–16 at Super Bowl XXXIV, thanks to a defensive goal-line stand. It also marked the beginning of the Rams' Greatest Show on Turf offense that would last for the next two seasons. Warner also became the first quarterback in NFL history to win a Super Bowl in their first season as a starter. Head coach Dick Vermeil retired from coaching following the season and would subsequently be replaced by his offensive coordinator Mike Martz, whom led the Rams to four playoff appearances and Super Bowl XXXVI during his four years as head coach.
 2000 Baltimore Ravens – After 4 years of losing seasons, the Ravens, who were established in 1996 as an expansion team, finished 12–4 and made the playoffs for the first time in franchise history, largely thanks to their record-setting defense. In the playoffs, the Ravens defeated the Denver Broncos, then defeated the defending AFC champion Tennessee Titans and the Oakland Raiders to reach Super Bowl XXXV against the New York Giants, in which the Ravens won their first Super Bowl championship by a score of 34–7. In just their first playoff appearance in franchise history, the Ravens were anticipated to have a very low chance of winning or even reaching the Super Bowl, with some believing they would lose like most brand-new teams that have made the playoffs for the first time.
 2001 New England Patriots – The Patriots were a mediocre team throughout much of their franchise history, even threatening to relocate to Hartford, Connecticut and St. Louis throughout most of the 1990s. The Patriots were coming off a disappointing 5–11 season in 2000. In 2001, the team's second season under head coach Bill Belichick, the Patriots began the season 1–3, and lost their starting quarterback Drew Bledsoe in the second game of the season, during the team's first game since the September 11 attacks on September 23 against the New York Jets, after he signed a 10-year contract worth $103 million. Tom Brady, a sixth-round, 199th pick in the 2000 NFL Draft took over as quarterback and led the team to an 11–5 finish, winning the AFC East division title. The season ended with a 20–17 upset victory over the 14–2 St. Louis Rams in Super Bowl XXXVI, ending the Rams' Greatest Show on Turf offense and any potential for a Rams dynasty. This season marked the beginning of the Patriots' dynasty, as they would reach the AFC Championship game twelve additional times and reach the Super Bowl eight more times winning five of them over the next seventeen years, being widely regarded as one of the greatest dynasties in the history of the National Football League. The Patriots and Rams would meet again 17 years later in Super Bowl LIII in which the Patriots won again, this time by a score of 13–3.
 2005 Pittsburgh Steelers – In 2005, the 6th seeded Steelers, who failed to improve on their 15–1 record from the last season and finished 11–5, began the season at 7–5; at that point the Steelers were in jeopardy of missing the playoffs but they went on to win their last four games to earn a Wild Card spot in the playoffs. They defeated their divisional rival, the Cincinnati Bengals in the playoffs, and after that 3 other teams who finished with 13+ wins; the Indianapolis Colts, Denver Broncos, and in Super Bowl XL, the Seattle Seahawks. This made the Steelers the first team since the 1985 Patriots to win 3 straight playoff games on the road, and this feat would later be matched by the 2007 Giants, the 2010 Packers, and the 2020 Buccaneers. The Steelers were led by 2004 1st round pick and sophomore quarterback Ben Roethlisberger, whom had led them to a near-perfect 14–1 record the season prior as a rookie.
 2007 New York Giants – In 2007, the 5th-seeded Giants, led by Eli Manning, the younger brother of Colts quarterback Peyton Manning and the top pick in the 2004 Draft, finished 10–6 in the regular season, won three playoff games on the road, defeating the Tampa Bay Buccaneers, Dallas Cowboys and Green Bay Packers, which culminated in a win over the 18–0 New England Patriots and Tom Brady in Super Bowl XLII. Three of the four Giants' playoff victories were against teams they had lost to in the regular season (Cowboys twice). At the time, their 10–6 regular season record was tied for the worst record among teams to win the Super Bowl. Today, the only Super Bowl-winning team to have a worse regular season record is the 2011 New York Giants, who, after a 9–7 regular season, again defeated the Patriots and Tom Brady in Super Bowl XLVI.
 2010 Green Bay Packers – After trading franchise quarterback Brett Favre (who had been with the Packers since the 1992 season) to the New York Jets 2 years earlier, the Packers failed to win their first division title since 2007 or improve on their 11–5 record from the season before, and finished the 2010 season 10–6 with the 6th seed in the NFC playoffs. Aaron Rodgers, the 24th overall pick in the 2005 Draft, took over as starting quarterback and led them to their first playoff win in the post-Favre era as they defeated the Philadelphia Eagles, Atlanta Falcons, and division rival Chicago Bears on the road to Super Bowl XLV against the Pittsburgh Steelers. The Packers won Super Bowl XLV by defeating the Steelers 31–25, winning their fourth Super Bowl title in franchise history. This also made the Packers the fourth team to win three straight playoff games on the road (the others being the 1985 Patriots, 2005 Steelers, and 2007 Giants). The next season, the Packers accomplished their most successful season at 15–1; however, they lost to the eventual champion New York Giants in the NFC divisional round.
 2012 Baltimore Ravens – The Ravens failed to improve on their 12–4 record from the previous season when they fell to the Patriots in the AFC Championship Game, and finished the 2012 season at 10–6. In the playoffs, the Ravens defeated the Indianapolis Colts, led by top draft pick Andrew Luck, the Denver Broncos in a memorable double-OT victory, and the Patriots to advance to play in Super Bowl XLVII against the San Francisco 49ers, coached by Jim Harbaugh, the younger brother of Ravens head coach John Harbaugh. The Ravens won their second title in franchise history after the 2000 season when they won Super Bowl XXXV. It made the Ravens the only NFL team to win all of its Super Bowl appearances, replacing the 49ers.
 2015 Denver Broncos – The Broncos came off a 12–4 season in which they lost to the Indianapolis Colts 13–24 and also the departure of head coach John Fox, after 5 seasons with the team. Despite once again finishing 12–4, quarterback Peyton Manning had the worst statistical season of his career since his rookie 1998 season with the Colts. After Manning suffered a torn plantar fascia in his foot during a Week 10 game vs. the Kansas City Chiefs, backup quarterback Brock Osweiler would start for the remainder of the regular season until the playoffs, where Manning returned from his injury and led the Broncos to victories over the Pittsburgh Steelers 23–16 in the divisional round, and then the defending Super Bowl champion New England Patriots 20–18 in the final game of the Tom Brady-Peyton Manning rivalry. In Super Bowl 50, the Broncos would then defeat the heavily favored Carolina Panthers for the Broncos' third Super Bowl title and their first in the post-John Elway era. Manning retired following the season, after playing 18 years in the league, and since this Super Bowl win and Manning's retirement the Broncos haven't qualified for the playoffs.
 2017 Philadelphia Eagles – The Eagles came into the season surrounded by doubts involving second-year quarterback Carson Wentz and head coach Doug Pederson. While the team started the season strong with a win–loss record of 11–2, injuries caught up to them as Wentz was ruled out for the season following a torn ACL in Week 14 vs. the Los Angeles Rams. Franchise left-tackle Jason Peters and linebacker Jordan Hicks missed extended periods of time. Backup quarterback Nick Foles took the reins from Wentz and the Eagles finished the season 13–3, securing the top NFC seed in the NFL playoffs. During the playoffs, they defeated the Atlanta Falcons 15–10 in the divisional round and the Minnesota Vikings 38–7 in the NFC championship game (coincidentally, Philadelphia defeated both teams in reverse order during their run to Super Bowl XXXIX 13 years earlier), and upset the New England Patriots by a score of 41–33 in Super Bowl LII, avenging their Super Bowl XXXIX loss and winning their first title since 1960. For his efforts in Super Bowl LII, Foles was named Super Bowl MVP, becoming the first backup quarterback to achieve this award since his opponent, Tom Brady, did so in Super Bowl XXXVI.
 2020 Tampa Bay Buccaneers — After 12 years of missing the playoffs, the Buccaneers, led by second-year head coach Bruce Arians, improved their 7–9 record from the previous season, posted their first 10-win season since 2010, and ended a 13-year playoff drought by making the playoffs for the first time since 2007 with an 11–5 record, but failed to win a division title when they were swept by the NFC South division champion New Orleans Saints in two regular season games. The off-season was headlined by adding former New England Patriots quarterback Tom Brady, a 20-year veteran, while trading for Rob Gronkowski after talks out of retirement. In the wild card round, the Buccaneers defeated the Washington Football Team (who won the NFC East division title with a losing record) 31–23, winning their first playoff game since their Super Bowl XXXVII run in 2002. Then they defeated the NFC South champions New Orleans Saints 30–20 in the divisional round, advancing to the NFC Championship. In the NFC Championship, the Buccaneers upset the top-seeded Green Bay Packers 31–26, advancing to Super Bowl LV where they defeated the defending champion Kansas City Chiefs 31–9, winning their second Super Bowl title in franchise history. Tom Brady was named Super Bowl MVP for the fifth time, becoming the only player to achieve five Super Bowl MVP awards. The Buccaneers joined the 1985 Patriots (lost Super Bowl XX to the Chicago Bears), 2005 Steelers, 2007 Giants, and 2010 Packers as the only NFL teams to win three straight playoff games on the road. This also made the Buccaneers the first team in NFL history to play in the Super Bowl on their home stadium.

College
 Northwestern Wildcats (1995) – After 23 consecutive losing seasons, the Wildcats won their first Big Ten Conference title since 1936 and recorded their first 10-win season since 1903. They went to the Rose Bowl Game for the first time ever, but lost a close game to USC by a score of 41–32.
 Wake Forest Demon Deacons (2006) – Wake Forest won the Atlantic Coast Conference title after being picked by the media to finish last in their division after losing their starting quarterback, starting running back, and starting left offensive tackle to injuries. The team and star linebacker Jon Abbate became the subject of a 2011 feature film, The 5th Quarter. Wake Forest was invited to the Orange Bowl, but lost to Louisville 24–13.
 Boise State Broncos (2006) – In only their ninth year in Division I-A (FBS) play, the Broncos staged a last-minute regulation rally and some trick plays to defeat perennial powerhouse Oklahoma Sooners in the 2007 Fiesta Bowl by a score of 43–42. Their trick plays included a hook-and-ladder touchdown pass on 4th-and-18 with little time to spare, a wide receiver rollout option in a variation of the Wildcat formation on another successful fourth-down conversion that resulted in another touchdown in the overtime period, and a Statue of Liberty play for the game-winning two-point conversion. The win capped a 13–0 season for the Broncos.

Arena football
 Washington Valor (2018) – The Valor finished the regular season with a 2–10 record, leaving themselves in last place among the four teams competing that season, who all advanced to the league's playoffs. The team defeated the Albany Empire 103–97 in a two-game total points series before facing the Baltimore Brigade in ArenaBowl XXXI. With the Valor's 69–55 victory over the Brigade in the championship game, they became the only team with a regular season winning percentage lower than .250 to win a championship in the history of the AFL.

Association football
 Manchester United F.C. (1967–68 European Cup) – The horror of the Munich air disaster on February 6, 1958, which killed eight members of Manchester United's back-to-back league championship winning team, leaving two others with injuries which meant they couldn't play again, is something that is written large in the history of English football and is still keenly felt at Old Trafford. The young team managed by Matt Busby had been dubbed "the Busby Babes" in the media, with football left in mourning as the plane carrying United back from a European Cup quarter-final against Red Star Belgrade crashed having stopped to refuel in Munich, killing 23 people. Busby himself had suffered life-threatening injuries, but he was determined to carry on and rebuild his team, even taking them to the FA Cup final that season. Eventually, United somehow recovered, winning the FA Cup in 1963 and then the league title in 1965 and 1967, before Busby's greatest ever achievement of leading them to the European Cup in 1968, 10 years after the deaths of talented, largely young players Duncan Edwards (21), Geoff Bent (25), Roger Byrne (28), Eddie Colman (21), Mark Jones (24), David Pegg (22), Tommy Taylor (26) and Liam "Billy" Whelan (22). Munich survivors Bill Foulkes and the team's captain, Bobby Charlton, who scored twice, were both in the team which beat Benfica 4–1 after extra-time at Wembley in 1968, sealing United's first European Cup a decade after their lowest ebb.
 Nottingham Forest F.C. (1978–79 European Cup) – Early in 1979, Clough and Taylor felt that Forest needed more firepower, so they made Birmingham forward Trevor Francis, Britain's first million-pound player. Forest couldn't have started their maiden European Cup campaign in better fashion, upsetting champions Liverpool with a 2–0 aggregate victory over the Merseysiders in the first round. They then coasted past AEK Athens (7–2) and Grasshopper (5–2) to set up a semi-final against Köln. In the semi-final first leg in England, Forest, who had already retained their League Cup crown, were held to a 3–3 draw by Köln but Bowyer's solitary strike in Germany saw them progress to the final, where they would face Malmö. In a tight tournament decider in Munich, Francis paid back his exorbitant transfer fee by scoring the game's only goal from a Robertson cross, as Forest were crowned European champions.
 Steaua Bucharest (1985–86 European Cup) – Romanian side Steaua Bucharest were a significant force back in their day, so much so that they went a huge 119 games unbeaten, including 104 league matches and 15 cup games. The club racked up a simply incredible five straight league titles and four Romanian cups as they went from 1985 to 1989 without suffering a single defeat in domestic football. Between 1986/87 and 1988/89, Steaua played 102 league games, winning 86 and drawing 16, scoring an average of three goals per game and conceding less than a goal per match. However, it took until 1986 when they became the first Eastern European side to lift the European Cup. Steaua beat Terry Venables' Barcelona in that final, despite being without their captain, who was suspended as Barcelona became the first team to miss all of their penalties in a European Cup final shootout.
 Red Star Belgrade (1990–91 European Cup) – Red Star, under the management of Ljupko Petrović, were far from a one-man team, with quality spread across the pitch. In goal was inspirational captain Stevan Stojanovic, Miodrag Belodedici was a key cog in defence having already won a European Cup with Steaua Bucharest, while the supremely talented quartet of Vladimir Jugović, Siniša Mihajlović, Robert Prosinečki and Dejan Savićević formed one of the greatest midfields ever seen in club football. In the first round of their victorious European Cup campaign, Red Star were held to a 1–1 draw at home by Grasshoppers but ran riot in the return leg, racking up resounding 4–1 win. Rangers were up next and despite the Scottish giants' domestic domination, they were fully aware of the challenge that awaited them. Petrović's side romped to a 3–0 win in Belgrade before claiming a 1–1 draw at Ibrox to coast into the quarter-finals, where they outclassed Dynamo Dresden, who had won the East German league before the reunification of Germany. Indeed, having won their home leg 3–0, Red Star were 2–1 up at the Rudolf-Harbig-Stadion when fans began hurling objects onto the pitch, thus prompting the referee to abandon the game and UEFA to award the visitors a 3–0 win. Red Star's fairy-tale campaign continued in Germany as they claimed a 2–1 first-leg win over Bayern Munich at Olympiastadion, but they almost threw the semi-final away in front of 80,000 fans in Belgrade. Despite opening the scoring in the 24th minute through Mihajlović, Bayern struck twice in the space of six second-half minutes and continued to lay siege to Red Star's goal in search of a winner. However, with Stojanović standing firm, the home side were able to seal their passage into the final thanks to an own goal from Klaus Augenthaler in the 90th minute of the game. Marseille awaited in the tournament decider in Bari. In a twist of fate that once again favoured Red Star, the Yugoslav First League that season had settled all drawn games via a penalty shoot-out, so Petrović's side were well-versed in the art of spot-kicks. After Manuel Amoros failed to convert Marseille's first penalty, Red Star kept their cool and calmly slotted home all of their efforts, with Darko Pančev, fittingly, the man to fire his team to the title they had set out to win four years prior.
 Denmark (Euro 1992) – Denmark won Euro 92, despite having failed to qualify until a technicality vanquished the hopes of Yugoslavia. The Yugoslav Wars caused the United Nations to impose Resolution 757 imposed sanctions that would disqualify Yugoslavia from international competitions despite having already won each succeeding qualifying tournament match on the way to the finals. Denmark would replace Yugoslavia in the tournament and eventually would successfully contest the reigning title holders, Germany to win the title, 2–0.
 Greece (Euro 2004) – Greece were the second-least favorite to win the 16-team competition, with only Latvia (who made their first appearance in a major tournament) being considered even less likely. Greece was given odds of 150–1 of winning before the tournament. They were drawn in Group A with Portugal, hosts and favourites to win, Spain, former European champions, and Russia, who won the first-ever Euros as the Soviet Union. Very few people expected Greece to progress to the quarter-finals, let alone win the tournament. Greece won the final 1–0 (the same scoreline as in their quarter-final, eliminating holders France, and semi-final), with Angelos Charisteas scoring the winning goal over in the 57th minute to defeat Portugal in Lisbon, having already beaten them in Porto on the opening day. While the dedication of the side and the victory were celebrated by their nation, Greece were dubbed by Barry Glendenning of The Guardian as "the only underdogs in history that everyone wants to see get beaten", due to Greece's rough defensive strategy.
 FC Porto (2003–04 UEFA Champions League) – A year after winning the UEFA Cup in 2003, José Mourinho's team entered the competition as the Portuguese league champions facing title favourites, Real Madrid, Partizan Belgrade and the French participant Marseille in group F. After finishing second in the group, they managed to win 2–1 at home in the first leg of the round of 16 against the Premier League champions Manchester United, and followed with Costinha's game-winning goal in the stoppage time to pull off the upset in the second leg at Old Trafford after being 1–0 down and tied on aggregate. Their miraculous run continued as they beat French champions Lyon in the quarter-final and the Spanish side Deportivo La Coruña in the semi-final. In the 2004 UEFA Champions League final, they faced Monaco at AufSchalke Arena where they, despite being labelled as the underdogs, won 3–0 with the goals from Deco, Carlos Alberto and Dmitri Alenichev. The Portuguese side stood victorious into the European summit by winning the second European title since 1987, and after the final, he decided to manage Chelsea a season later. Porto's European win became the first team to win the European Cup outside of teams from Spain, England, Italy and Germany since Marseille won in 1993 as the first title under the Champions League era, Red Star Belgrade in 1991 and Steaua Bucharest in 1986.
 Liverpool F.C. (2004–05 UEFA Champions League) – After finishing fourth the previous season, newly-appointed manager Rafael Benítez's squad needed to get through past the Austrian side, Grazer AK in the fourth qualifying round in order to advance to the group stage, they won the first leg in Graz on the road 2–0 thanks to Gerrard's goals despite losing in the second leg at home to progress to the competition proper. They were then drawn against AS Monaco, Deportivo La Coruña and Olympiacos in the group stage. It was a rocky start in the group stage despite winning the first match at home against Monaco, 2–0, but they lost to Olympiacos on the road and drew against Deportivo at home where they won the reverse fixture in matchday 4 at Riazor thanks to the Depor defender's own goal to keep their hopes to the knockout stage alive. Their attempt stoppedwith a defeat to Monaco away in the fifth week. On the brink of elimination, Liverpool needed to win at home against Olympiacos on the final day of the group stage by widening their goal difference. However, Rivaldo scored a free kick to make it 1–0, putting Liverpool in danger. As half-time ended, Florent Sinama-Pongolle levelled things up, 1–1 in the 47th minute and Neil Mellor extended their lead at the 81st minute but the two-goal cushion would not be enough to progress. Steven Gerrard came in by scoring the game-winning volley in the 86th minute to send them to the knockout stage. During the round of 16 against the 2002 finalists, Bayer Leverkusen where Liverpool won the first leg at home, 3–1 and on the road in the second leg to get through to the quarter-finals against Juventus. This was the first meeting between the two clubs since the 1985 European Cup final and the Heysel Stadium disaster. They won the first leg at home 2–1, and drew without goals scored in Turin in the second leg. The Reds then progressed to the semi-final against the eventual English champions, Chelsea to open another chapter of the exciting rivalry. The Reds drew on the road at Stamford Bridge in West London at the first leg of the semi-final and then returned to Anfield for the final leg where Luís García scored the ghost goal four minutes after kick-off towards Petr Čech's net to progress to their first European Cup final since 1985, this time against Carlo Ancelotti and AC Milan in Istanbul. In the 2005 European Cup final, the Reds went on have a bad start in the final after being down 3–0 thanks to Paolo Maldini's early goal and two goals from Hernán Crespo before half-time. then Rafael Benítez came up with a plan. As the second half started, Gerrard raised the morale for the Reds by cutting their deficit by two and then Vladimír Šmicer followed to make it 2–1. Minutes later, Gattuso brought Milan Baroš down to signal a penalty for Liverpool. Xabi Alonso failed to convert the penalty but followed in towards Dida's net to pull off the huge comeback by tying the game at 3 and force the final into extra time. However, both teams did not score at the extra time and the final had to be decided by a penalty shoot-out. In the shoot-out, Serginho shot wide towards the Dudek net and Dietmar Hamann scored the first goal as the ball went towards the Dida net as Pirlo failed to tie the shootout where Kaká and Tomasson scored two goals for Milan and then, Šmicer scored the championship-winning goal for Liverpool. Moments later, when Liverpool led 3–2 on penalties, Andriy Shevchenko, whose penalty won the title in 2003 for AC Milan, failed to convert from the spot as the Reds finally won the fifth Champions League title for the first time in 21 years after pulling the biggest comeback since the 1999 final in Barcelona, where Manchester United brought the first treble to the English soil by beating Bayern Munich. The match was called "the Miracle of Istanbul" for the media due to Liverpool's huge comeback as Gerrard raised the European Cup trophy. Liverpool are the only English side to own the actual Champions League trophy permanently before UEFA brought replaced it with a full-sized replica a season later.
 Iraq (2007 AFC Asian Cup) – Devastated from the ongoing war within the country. The Iraqi national team have to play the qualifier matches in the United Arab Emirates. Iraq qualified to the final group round and reached the knockout stage after an upset 3–1 victory against Australia. After defeating Vietnam in quarterfinals, Iraq won 4–3 against tournament favourites South Korea in a penalty shootout, resulting in thousands of Iraqis celebrating in the streets of Baghdad. Over 50 Iraqis were killed by terrorist bombs targeting these crowds. Iraq's 1–0 victory against Saudi Arabia in finale secured them their first – and only – Asian Cup title to date.
 Montpellier HSC (2011–12 Ligue 1) – On 20 May 2012, at the final day of the season, Paris Saint-Germain needed three points to secure their first French title as they visited Lorient on the road but Carlo Ancelotti's side won 2–1 as they await for the results between AJ Auxerre and Montpellier. Fortunately for the Hérault side, they won on the road 2–1 to clinch their first French title in the club's history after finishing 14th last season and qualify for the next season's UEFA Champions League.
 Chelsea F.C. (2011–12 UEFA Champions League) – In the previous season, Chelsea qualified for the competition as the second-placed team in the Premier League. Despite the team's smooth performance in the group stage with three wins, two draws and one loss, things went sour as Andre Villas-Boas was sacked after losing to Napoli in the first leg of the round of 16 and the caretaker, Roberto di Matteo, came up with a plan on how to win the entire tie and the second leg at Stamford Bridge. Just at the end of the regulation, Frank Lampard forced the tie to the extra time by a penalty as Branislav Ivanović scored the winning-goal to send his side to the quarter-final against Benfica where they would move on to the next round with a 3–1 aggregate. Despite winning the first leg of the semi-final at home, Chelsea were on the brink of elimination after being down 2–0 at the first half at second leg in Camp Nou until Fernando Torres scored the winning goal to send to the Champions League final in Munich. In the UEFA Champions League final, Chelsea's opponents were Bayern Munich. By coincidence, the match was being held at the Allianz Arena, Bayern's home ground. Bayern took the lead after 83 minutes through Thomas Müller, but five minutes later, Didier Drogba headed in the equaliser – his ninth goal in nine cup finals for Chelsea – to take the game to extra time. Bayern were awarded a penalty, but Arjen Robben's strike was saved by Petr Čech. The game remained 1–1, meaning it went to a penalty shootout. Bayern took a 3–1 lead after Juan Mata saw his penalty saved, but Čech then saved Ivica Olić and Bastian Schweinsteiger's efforts, leaving Drogba to score the decisive spot-kick to clinch Chelsea's first Champions League title in their history. In 2013, the International Federation of Football History & Statistics (IFFHS) ranked Chelsea the number one team in the world, replacing Barcelona at the top of the world rankings. Chelsea became the first team from London to lift the European Cup since the English teams entered the competition in 1956.
 Club Tijuana (Apertura 2012) – In their second season in the Mexican First Division. Xolos obtained their first league title and qualified for 2013 Copa Libertadores.
 Western Sydney Wanderers (2012–13 A-League) and (2014 AFC Champions League) – In their first season of the Australian A-League, the Wanderers secured the Premiership with a 3–0 win over the Newcastle Jets. This qualified them for the Asian Champions League, where next year they topped their group, and proceeded to defeat vastly more experienced and resourced clubs, including previous winners Guangzhou Evergrande Taobao F.C., runners up FC Seoul and multi-time champions Al-Hilal FC, whom the Wanderers defeated 1–0 in the final. The Wanderers became the first Australian team to win the competition.
 Leicester City F.C. (2015–16 Premier League) – The story started when the bookmakers rated Leicester 5,000-1 odds to win the Premier League after the sacking of Nigel Pearson. Pearson was not able to build on his success, however, as he was sacked following a controversial pre-season incident involving a number of players including his own son, James, in Thailand, with experienced tactician Claudio Ranieri parachuted into the job. Ranieri had previously managed clubs such as Chelsea, Juventus, Inter, Atlético Madrid and Napoli, but had failed to win a first division title in his previous 19 years of management. His most recent job before arriving at the King Power Stadium had been with the Greece national team, though he was sacked midway through their Euro 2016 qualification campaign having overseen a terrible run of results that included a humiliating defeat to the Faroe Islands. His appointment at Leicester was viewed by many onlookers with scepticism, including former England and Foxes striker Gary Lineker, who believed Ranieri had used up all his chances coaching at the highest level. Despite Leicester's hot finish to the previous season, Ranieri inherited a squad that looked devoid of attacking talent. Their top scorer in the league had been journeyman Argentine striker Leonardo Ulloa with 11 goals, while his sidekick Vardy found the back of the net on only five occasions in 34 Premier League matches. The Foxes' main winger Riyad Mahrez only contributed four goals and three assists while midfield playmaker Danny Drinkwater was in and out of the first team. In a bid to improve their squad to avoid another relegation battle, Leicester spent just short of £30 million on 10 players, including midfielder N'Golo Kanté from French side Caen, Stoke City defender Robert Huth and Japanese striker Shinji Okazaki, while experienced Austrian full-back Christian Fuchs arrived on a free from Schalke. On the face of it, the new arrivals offered as much inspiration as Ranieri's appointment, and as such many felt Leicester were in for another tough season, with avoiding relegation seemingly their only target. Using an unfashionable 4-4-2 formation, Ranieri set his system up to be defensively solid, with skipper Wes Morgan partnering Huth in a highly-physical centre-half partnership. It quickly emerged that new signing Kanté, who made his debut playing on the left wing against Bournemouth in August, was an excellent ball-winning midfielder, with his ability to intercept the ball regularly underpinned by his play-reading qualities. Drinkwater, meanwhile, worked hard in the engine room, with an expectation on the former Manchester United trainee to regularly play passes over the top of the opposition defence into space. Almost overnight, Mahrez made the jump from inconsistent enigma to a world-class winger, with exceptional dribbling, finishing, movement and creative play. Vardy, meanwhile, was employed as the main man up front alongside either Okazaki or Ulloa, with the pacy English striker able to sit on the shoulder of defenders and consistently put them under pressure with his intense pressing while constantly looking to get in behind using his speed. The Foxes began the season unbeaten in August with 3 wins and 3 matches drawn but their record missed by Arsenal, 5–2 in their first meeting of the season at home in September. During October and November, Leicester regained their unbeaten record where they faced against Manchester United at home, Jamie Vardy scored the historic 11th goal in 11 games to break the previous Ruud van Nistelrooy's record after tying it at Newcastle United on the road, however the another unbeaten attempt ended on the Boxing Day when Jürgen Klopp's Liverpool beat them at Anfield, 1–0. As the calendar turned to the new year with the Foxes being unbeaten in January, Mahrez and Huth scored the three goals against Manchester City on the road to extend their gap to six points. In April, the Foxes remained unbeaten in five games. In May, the Foxes beat Swansea City at home with just three games remaining from claiming their first English title, however Anthony Martial cancelled Leicester's road party at Old Trafford despite a 1–1 draw as they would need the London derby between Spurs and Chelsea at Stamford Bridge to finish with a Chelsea win or draw to secure the championship for Leicester City. The match between Tottenham Hotspur and Chelsea ended 2–2, and with just two games to spare, Leicester City became the 2015–16 Premier League champions, the only championship in the history of the club as of far, just two seasons after gaining promotion to the Premier League in which they narrowly avoided relegation on their return. Bookmakers who had rated them at 5,000–1 odds to win the title were forced to pay out £25 million, the biggest loss on a sporting event in British history. With Leicester's win, they became the first new winners in the Premier League/First Division era since Nottingham Forest in 1978.
 Tai Po FC (2018–19 Hong Kong Premier League) – Tai Po FC secured their first title with a game to spare after a 2–1 win over R&F, which left them 5 points clear at the top of the table. They became the first district team to win a top-flight title since 1963.
 Lille (2020–21 Ligue 1) – Under the management of Christophe Galtier, Lille won their first Ligue 1 title in ten years, beating defending champions Paris Saint-Germain, who had won seven of the last eight titles, by a single point after a 2–1 win over Angers on the last day of the season. This was one of the most unlikely French title wins in history, given that PSG has backing from Qatar Sports Foundation and Lille only narrowly avoided relegation in the 2017–18 season.
 Chelsea F.C. (2020–21 UEFA Champions League) – Chelsea qualified for the Champions League through a fourth-placed finish in the 2019–20 Premier League, just four points ahead of Leicester City. They started the competition with a 0–0 home draw against Sevilla, but proceeded to win four straight games to seal top spot in Group E despite Frank Lampard later sacked after the group stage. In the round of 16, they defeated an Atlético Madrid side who went on to win the 2020–21 La Liga, 3–0 on aggregate, on the Thomas Tuchel's Champions League managerial return after being sacked from Paris Saint-Germain. After edging out Porto in the quarter-finals, they faced the record winners Real Madrid in the semi-finals. A 1–1 away draw was followed by a 2–0 home win, which sealed the Blues' progress into the final, where they faced the 2020–21 Premier League champions and tournament favourites Manchester City. A goal from Kai Havertz sealed a 1–0 win as they won their second Champions League title.
 Olympique Lyonnais Féminin (2021–22 UEFA Women's Champions League) – OL Féminin have been the power of the French women's football for decades, but come unbothered in the European women's football. Lyon qualified for the Women's Champions League as the runners-up in the French's top tier last season as they would overcome against Spain's Levante in the second round of the qualifying by leading 4–2 on an aggregate to progress to the group stage. In the group stage, they stayed undefeated until losing to Bayern Munich in matchday 4 on the road and despite this, they progressed to the quarter-finals where they faced against Juventus. Lyon lost the first leg at the 2022 final venue on the road to Juventus, 2–1 despite commanding a 1–0 lead, and they came back from the death in the second leg at home after Macario scored the tie-winning goal in the 73rd minute to progress to the semi-final against the French rival, Paris Saint-Germain. However, it was not the smooth start to start the semi-final at home after Katoto scored the first goal in the sixth minute and then, Lyon came back to tie at one each and retook the lead by the goal from Macario in the 34th minute to seal the first leg win and then followed by their second leg win in Paris, 2–1 to punch their ticket to the final in Turin where they faced against the 2021 European champions, Barcelona who had a ten-game unbeaten run in the entire competition. During the final, Amandine Henry's long range effort in the sixth minute put their unbeaten run in danger, as well as Barça Femení's European title defence; Ada Hegerberg scored the second goal in the final in the 23rd minute and then Macario scored the championship-winning goal to pull off the huge upset and end Barça Femení's unbeaten run final as the European champions as Lyon won the seventh European title by winning the final, 3–1.
 Ventforet Kofu (2022 Emperor's Cup) – Ventforet was playing in its first ever Emperor's Cup final, as their previous best finish was the quarter-final round. It was also their first elite cup final, as they never advanced past the quarter-finals in the J.League Cup. Ventforet started in the second round, as a member of J2. They defeated International Pacific University, 5–1, and then J1 side Hokkaido Consadole Sapporo in the third round, 2–1. In the round of 16, they defeated Sagan Tosu, 3–1, then needed extra time to defeat Avispa Fukuoka in the quarter-finals, 2–1, before defeating J1 League powerhouse Kashima Antlers, 1–0. Their run came to an end with an exciting game against Sanfrecce Hiroshima. After finishing 1–1 in regular time, Ventforet Kofu won 5–4 on penalty shoot-out and qualified for the 2023–24 AFC Champions League group stage.
 Wuhan Three Towns F.C. (2022 Chinese Super League) - After two straight promotions, Wuhan Three Towns played in the Chinese Super League for the first time in their history. They remained top of the table from the beginning to the end of the season, and after being awarded a 3–0 win over Tianjin Teda F.C. on 31 December 2022, they were crowned champions, by goal difference over Shandong Taishan F.C., and qualified for the 2023–24 AFC Champions League group stage.

Australian rules football
 Western Bulldogs (2016) – After failing to qualify for the finals for four consecutive seasons from 2011 to 2014 and losing their 2015 elimination final to Adelaide, the Bulldogs finished seventh in the regular season standings with a record of 15–7. After defeating West Coast and Hawthorn on the road by more than 30 points, they defeated Greater Western Sydney (who qualified for the finals for the first time ever) by 6 points to advance to the Grand Final, where they would face the top-seeded Sydney Swans. In the Grand Final, the Bulldogs defeated the heavily favoured Swans by 21 points after trailing by two points at the end of the second quarter to win their first premiership since 1954. This was the first time in AFL history where a team that was seeded seventh or lower won the premiership.

Baseball

Major League Baseball
 1969 New York Mets – The Mets won their first ever World Series title after defeating the heavily favored 109-win Baltimore Orioles in the 1969 World Series; previously, the Mets had finished either last or next-to-last in the National League every year of their existence.
 1997 Florida Marlins – After missing the Postseason for every season of their existence, the Marlins finally made the Postseason in 1997 as a Wild Card, posting their first winning season at 92–70. They then beat the Giants in the NLDS and the Braves in the NLCS, winning their first Pennant in just their 5th season of operation. They then won their first World Series against the Indians in 7 games on a walk-off hit in 11 innings and became the first Wild Card team to win the World Series.
 2003 Florida Marlins – After firing manager Jeff Torborg and replacing him with Jack McKeon mid-season, the Marlins used a strong second half to win the World Series, after defeating the San Francisco Giants in the NLDS, the Chicago Cubs in the NLCS, and the New York Yankees. The NL Championship Series was especially memorable for the Marlins' rally and another Cubs collapse, as it extended the alleged Curse of the Billy Goat, and made it 95 consecutive years without a World Series victory for Chicago until winning it all in 2016 to break the curse despite the team was not considered as the underdog either due to the better regular season record with 103 wins racking.
 2004 Boston Red Sox – The 2004 Red Sox ended an 86-year World Series drought by winning eight straight games to come back from a 3−0 ALCS deficit against their rival New York Yankees. While most Cinderella teams come from relative obscurity to win a championship, the 2004 Red Sox won 98 regular season games and were a dominant team throughout the 2004 regular season. They did, however, defeat a New York Yankees team which won 101 games, along with sweeping the St. Louis Cardinals, who won a league-best 105 regular season games. However, their Cinderella status was established after becoming the first Major League Baseball team to overcome a 3 games to 0 series deficit in a 7-game series and only the third team in Major American professional sports to achieve such a feat.
 2006 St. Louis Cardinals – The 2006 Cardinals began their season strongly, leading their division with a 31–16 record by late May, but suffered a mid-season slump due to injuries, two eight-game losing streaks, a seven-game losing streak, losing months in June, August and September, and by August 24, they were considered unlikely to make the playoffs with a mediocre record of 66–60. However, the Cardinals made the playoffs for the sixth time in the last seven seasons by clinching a weak National League Central with an 83–78 record, the worst of any playoff team, ahead of the second-place Houston Astros by 1½ games. Once the playoffs began, they surprised baseball fans everywhere by beating the San Diego Padres in the four-game Division Series, beating the New York Mets in the seven-game NLCS, and beating the Detroit Tigers in the 2006 World Series 4–1, winning the tenth, and probably most unlikely, World Series championship in franchise history. Their .516 winning percentage is the worst ever for a World Series champion.
 2011 St. Louis Cardinals – Like 2006, the 2011 Cardinals began their season strongly, leading their division throughout much of April and May, but suffered a mid-season slump, and by August 24, they were considered unlikely to make the playoffs with a mediocre record of 67–63, ten games behind the Milwaukee Brewers in the NL Central standings, and in third place for the wild card, 10½ games behind the Atlanta Braves. However, the Cardinals won 23 of their last 32 games, clinching the wild card on the last day of the regular season after the Braves collapsed. The Cardinals defeated the Philadelphia Phillies, the Milwaukee Brewers, and the Texas Rangers in the NLDS, NLCS, and World Series, respectively, despite being the underdog in all three series. On September 12, when the Cardinals were still 4½ games behind in the wild card race with 15 games to play, an unidentified man bet $250 on them to win the National League championship at 500-to-1 odds, and another $250 on them to win the World Series at 999-to-1 odds. Both bets paid off, and the man won $375,000.
 2019 Washington Nationals – The Nationals had experienced many years of playoff failure despite talented teams, losing in the first round of the postseason in the 2012, 2014, 2016 and 2017 seasons. After losing star outfielder Bryce Harper in free agency to one of their division rivals, the Philadelphia Phillies, Washington was largely expected to miss the playoffs in 2019, with some experts having them finishing 4th in the NL East behind the New York Mets, in addition to the favored Atlanta Braves and Phillies. Washington overcame a 19–31 start to obtain a wild card berth thanks to a 74–38 finish. In the NL Wild Card Game, the team rallied from being down 3–1 in the 8th inning against the Milwaukee Brewers and star closer Josh Hader, overcame a 2–1 NLDS deficit against the 106-win Los Angeles Dodgers, winning the series on an extra-innings grand slam by Howie Kendrick after back to back solo shots by star players Anthony Rendon and Juan Soto tied the game when the team was down to its final 6 outs in the 8th inning. After sweeping the St. Louis Cardinals in the NLCS to win the first NL pennant in franchise history, the team trailed the MLB-best 107–55 Houston Astros, a team many experts considered to be the greatest of all time, 3 games to 2 in the World Series, with the final 2 games in Houston. After winning Game 6, the Nationals trailed 2–0 in the 7th inning of Game 7 when home runs by Rendon and Kendrick gave Washington the lead, as they would go on to beat Houston 6–2 to win Game 7 and the first World Series in franchise history, completing one of the biggest upset runs in modern sports history. The 2019 World Series was the first and only time in all four major North American sports which involved the road team winning all seven games of a single postseason series.
 2021 Atlanta Braves – The Braves became only the second team in MLB history, and the first team since the 1964 St. Louis Cardinals to clinch a World Series title despite having a losing record at the All-Star break, and they also became the fourth team to reach the World Series, despite that losing record. Before August 6, the Braves had never secured a record above .500. They started off the postseason in style by defeating the Milwaukee Brewers 3−1, then they proceeded to upset the Los Angeles Dodgers 4−2, in a rematch of the previous year's National League Championship Series (where they blow a 3−1 lead and lost).  The Braves faced the Houston Astros in the World Series, where they ultimately clinched the title after a 7−0 shutout in Game 6, to give Atlanta its first major sports championship since 1995.

College
 Fresno State (2008) – In one of the more improbable Cinderella stories in American sports history, the Bulldogs surmounted a daunting array of obstacles on their way to the NCAA title. Fresno State had never won an NCAA championship in any men's sport going into the 2008 tournament. The Bulldogs entered the Western Athletic Conference tournament at 33–27; they would likely not have made the NCAA tournament without winning the WAC tournament, which they did. They subsequently played a total of six elimination games in their NCAA tournament run, winning all six. Fresno State ended their magical run by upsetting the heavily favored Georgia Bulldogs in the championship series.
 Virginia (2015) – After struggling to an even 15–15 record in Atlantic Coast Conference (ACC) play and going 1–3 in the ACC Baseball Tournament, Virginia surprisingly won their first NCAA baseball title in school history. The Cavaliers capped off their championship run by defeating Vanderbilt in three games in the College World Series final, thereby avenging their loss to the Commodores in last year's CWS championship series.
 Ole Miss (2022) – The Rebels, who were ranked #1 throughout the latter half of March, stumbled to a 7–14 record in Southeastern Conference (SEC) play before settling with a 14–16 mark in the conference. They were then eliminated in the first round of the SEC Baseball Tournament, but Ole Miss entered the NCAA Tournament as the last at-large team selected. Unexpectedly, the Rebels won their first ever NCAA baseball national championship, going on an impressive 10–1 run in the tourney.

Nippon Professional Baseball
 Hokkaido Nippon-Ham Fighters (2006) – The Fighters constantly finished dead last or near the bottom in the Pacific League standings, with their best finish coming in their first season in Hokkaido, 66-65-2, for a 3rd seed, but lost to the Seibu Lions in the first stage of the Climax Series, 2–1. In 2006, the Fighters finished first unexpectedly, going 82–54, one of the last NPB seasons by a team to not end with any ties. They faced off against the newly renamed Fukuoka SoftBank Hawks in the second stage, and swept them 2–0, while the Fighters had a 1-game advantage. Led by Yu Darvish, an ace with an almost unlimited pitching arsenal, the Fighters defeated the heavily favored Chunichi Dragons in the 2006 Japan Series, 4–1, for their first Japan Series title since 1962 which was under Toei. They eventually advanced to the 2006 Asia Series, where they went 3–0 in the round robin, then defeated the La New Bears in the championship, 1–0.
 Tohoku Rakuten Golden Eagles (2013) – As an expansion team that was added to the Pacific League to replace the Orix BlueWave (which merged with the Orix Buffaloes before the 2005 season), the Golden Eagles played relatively poorly during their first seven seasons in the league; they advanced to the Climax Series in 2009, marking their only playoff appearance during that time. The city of Sendai and the team's home stadium was affected by the 2011 Tohoku earthquake and tsunami, which was the most powerful earthquake to ever hit Japan. The team unexpectedly played well during the 2013 season, which happened two years after the earthquake disaster. Masahiro Tanaka registered a 24–0 regular season record, sending the Golden Eagles to a first-place finish in the Pacific League and a Climax Series matchup with the Chiba Lotte Marines. Tohoku, who entered the series with a 1–0 series lead, defeated Chiba in five games to advance to the 2013 Japan Series, where they would face the heavily favored Central League champion Yomiuri Giants. In the Japan Series, the Eagles defeated the Giants in seven games to win their first championship title.
 Tokyo Yakult Swallows (2021) – Entering 2021 with low expectations as they finished in last place in Central League three times in a row up to that point, the Swallows really played well in 2021, going 73-52-18, also the best record in NPB that season. They have been rebuilding for years, and it seems their parts started to finally click. This allowed them to book a ticket to the Climax Series to set a date with their crosstown rival Yomiuri Giants. Led by foreign closer Scott McGough, superstar infielders Munetaka Murakami and Tetsuto Yamada, and two 200 hit season outfielder Nori Aoki, the Swallows sent the Giants home with a 3–0 series sweep, including a tie in the 3rd game that allowed Yakult to advance with a better record. The run ended with a 4-2 Japan Series win over the Orix Buffaloes, which included an almost tie game in Game 6 in which if Orix won the following game if it were to tie, would force the first Game 8 since the 1986 Japan Series.

Basketball

National Basketball Association
 1968–69 Boston Celtics – The Boston Celtics were coming off a championship against Jerry West, Elgin Baylor and the Los Angeles Lakers and superstar center Bill Russell was heading into what would be his final year. The aging Celtics had won 10 of the previous 12 NBA Championships, but with offensive powerhouse Wilt Chamberlain joining the already powerful Lakers, it appeared as if the Celtics, who were practically limping into the finals, would easily be taken care of. The Celtics fell into a quick 2 games to none deficit (followed by a 3 games to 2 deficit) but came back to force a Game 7 in Los Angeles, with Bill Russell calmly stating "One thing the Lakers cannot do, is beat us". With the Lakers preparing balloons and confetti for "when, not if, they win", the Celtics took inspiration from their arrogance and went on to win it with a key circus basket by Don Nelson that bounced high from the back of the rim before sailing through the net. The win sent Russell and fellow hall of famer Sam Jones to retirement as champions, with Russell winning his 11th championship and Jones his tenth.
 1994–95 Houston Rockets – The Rockets were the sixth seeded team in the 1995 playoffs, yet managed to become the champions for the second straight year in the 1995 NBA Finals by sweeping Shaquille O'Neal and the Orlando Magic, setting playoff records for most games won on the road as well as upsetting three 60-win teams in dramatic fashion en route to defending their championship.
 1998–99 San Antonio Spurs – Due to a lockout that shortened the NBA's schedule to 50 from the usual 82 games, the Spurs didn't start their season until February 1999. Predicted by many as the worst team during the first half of the season, they began the season slow at 6–8 but had finished the regular season with a win–loss record of 37–13 (a winning percentage of ) and secured the top seed in the Western Conference playoffs. In the playoffs, the Spurs defeated the Minnesota Timberwolves in 4 games, and swept their next two opponents, the Los Angeles Lakers and Portland Trail Blazers. The Spurs then became the first former American Basketball Association (ABA) team to advance to play in the NBA Finals, defeating the eighth seeded New York Knicks in 5 games to win their first title in franchise history. The Spurs were led by sophomore star Tim Duncan, the top pick in the 1997 draft whom would lead his Spurs to four more titles in the next 15 years. Future Golden State Warriors coach Steve Kerr also signed with the Spurs that year as he became one of three players (the others being Patrick McCaw and Frank Saul) to win consecutive titles with different teams, and Kerr and Saul are also the only players in the history of the NBA to win 4 straight titles that weren't part of the 1960s Boston Celtics dynasty.
 2003–04 Detroit Pistons – The Pistons had just hired Larry Brown as their new head coach (whom had previously led the Philadelphia 76ers to a Finals appearance in 2001) and the year before, drafted Darko Milicic with the second overall pick that they obtained from the Memphis Grizzlies, but used him as a reserve as he played limited minutes off the bench; he would later be regarded as one of the most infamous busts in the history of the NBA. Finishing the regular season with a win–loss record of 54–28 (a winning percentage of ) and competing as the third seed in the Eastern Conference, the Pistons defeated the Milwaukee Bucks, New Jersey Nets, and Indiana Pacers in the playoffs to reach the NBA Finals against the Los Angeles Lakers, in which the Pistons defeated the Lakers in 5 games and ended a 14-year championship drought. The Pistons would advance to play in the Finals the next year but would lose to the San Antonio Spurs in 7 games. The Pistons also advanced to play in the Eastern Conference Finals for the next 3 years, but lost to the Miami Heat, Cleveland Cavaliers, and Boston Celtics respectively and their 6-season streak of appearing in the Eastern Conference Finals came to an end in the 2008–09 season with a 4-game sweep from the Cavaliers in that year's first round.
 2010–11 Dallas Mavericks – After 4 years of playoff disappointments (including their 2007 season when they were upset by the eighth seeded Golden State Warriors), the Mavericks, led by Dirk Nowitzki, finished the regular season with a win–loss record of 57–25 (a winning percentage of ) and qualified for the playoffs as the third seed in the Western Conference. The Mavericks defeated the Portland Trail Blazers, swept the back-to-back defending champion Los Angeles Lakers, and then defeated the Oklahoma City Thunder in five games in the Western Conference finals to reach the Finals against the Miami Heat, whom were led by the superstar trio of LeBron James, Chris Bosh, and Dwyane Wade. With no other All-Stars on the team, the Nowitzki-led Mavericks would defeat the Heat in 6 games, claiming their first title in franchise history. In addition, the Mavericks also defeated five players who have been named MVP at least once in their career; Kobe Bryant of the Lakers (2008), Russell Westbrook (2017), Kevin Durant (2014), and James Harden (2018) of the Thunder, and LeBron James (2009/2010, 2012/2013).
 2015–16 Cleveland Cavaliers – In the summer of 2014, superstar LeBron James announced to return to his hometown team via free agency to potentially win them a championship, after several postseason disappointments during his first seven seasons in Cleveland. After James and the Cavaliers lost in the NBA Finals the previous year, the Cavaliers finished the 2016 season with a win–loss record of 57–25 (a winning percentage of ) and hired assistant Tyronn Lue as their new head coach. The Cavaliers defeated the Detroit Pistons, the Atlanta Hawks, and the Toronto Raptors in the NBA playoffs to advance to play in the Finals against the Golden State Warriors for the second straight year. The Warriors, who had finished with the league's best-ever single season regular season win–loss record of 73–9 (a winning percentage of ), led the series 3 games to 1. However, the Cavaliers rallied to win the final three games of the series to win their first and only championship in franchise history and ending a 52-year championship drought dating back to the 1964 NFL title won by the Cleveland Browns. This made Cleveland the first team in NBA history to win a championship after overcoming a 3 games to 1 series deficit. The clinching seventh game featured an iconic chase-down block by James in the closing minutes of the fourth quarter.
 2018–19 Toronto Raptors – During the 2018 offseason, after getting swept by the Cleveland Cavaliers in the second round for two years in a row, the Raptors began another year of rebuilding, and in a blockbuster trade, sent their franchise player DeMar DeRozan to the San Antonio Spurs in exchange for Kawhi Leonard and Danny Green. Coming off an injury-plagued season in which he played only 9 games and after listing the Los Angeles Lakers as his "top" trade destination, Leonard led the Raptors to a 58–24 record (a winning percentage of ) and a sixth consecutive playoff berth. In the NBA playoffs, the Raptors defeated the Orlando Magic, the Philadelphia 76ers on a Leonard buzzer beater in Game 7, and the top-seeded Milwaukee Bucks to advance to play in the NBA Finals. The Raptors then defeated the defending back-to-back champion Golden State Warriors in six games to win their first championship in franchise history and to end a 26-year Canadian championship drought that dated back to the 1993 World Series title won by Major League Baseball's Toronto Blue Jays. Point guard Jeremy Lin became the first Asian-American NBA champion, center Marc Gasol, along with his brother Pau of the Bucks became the first pair of brothers to win championships, and Patrick McCaw became both the first player (since his former Warriors coach Steve Kerr) to win consecutive titles with different teams, and the first to three-peat since Shaquille O'Neal and Kobe Bryant from 2000 to the 2002 seasons. Following the season, Leonard signed with his hometown Los Angeles Clippers in free agency.

College
 North Carolina State University Wolfpack (1983) – The Wolfpack defeated the heavily favored "Phi Slama Jama" Houston Cougars, led by future hall-of-famers Hakeem Olajuwon and Clyde Drexler, 54–52 to win the NCAA men's tournament on Lorenzo Charles' last second dunk.
 Villanova Wildcats (1985) – The eighth-seeded Wildcats (unranked in the final AP poll) beat defending champion and ten-point-favorite Georgetown, who had already beaten Villanova twice in the regular season. To date, the Wildcat squad remains the only eighth-seed and the lowest overall seed in tournament history to win the championship.
 Kansas Jayhawks (1988) – During the championship season, Kansas started 12–8 and fell out of the rankings. The regular season included losses at Allen Fieldhouse against Kansas State, Duke, and Oklahoma.  Kansas managed to get a six seed and won their first three games of the tournament defeating No. 11 Xavier, No. 14 Murray State, and No. 7 Vanderbilt to reach the Elite Eight.  After getting revenge against Kansas State in the Elite Eight, Kansas headed to the Final Four in nearby Kansas City where they defeated Duke to reach the national championship game and defeated Oklahoma 83–79 to win the national championship. Led by senior Danny Manning and head coach Larry Brown, the team became known as "Danny and the Miracles".
 UConn Huskies (2014) – After being banned from postseason play the previous year, the Huskies unexpectedly won the NCAA tournament, becoming the first 7 seed to do so. They beat teams such as Michigan State, Villanova, Kentucky (whom were on a Cinderella run themselves), and 1st-overall seed Florida, and were led by second-year coach Kevin Ollie.

High school
In 1937, the basketball team at Bellfountain High School, where twenty-seven students attended, won the Oregon state championship. This included defeating teams from two much larger Portland high schools (each with over 1,000 students) in the semi-final and final.

European
 Slovenia (EuroBasket 2017) – After finishing 12th in the EuroBasket 2015, the Slovenian team, consisted of mostly players from European leagues, with only one player from the NBA and led by the team's captain Goran Dragić, won its first-ever European Championship. They were drawn in Group A with Finland, co-hosts, France, former European champions, Greece, who won two European Championships in 1987 and 2005, Iceland, qualified for the second-straight European Championship, and Poland. Slovenia placed first in its group without a loss and advanced to the round of 16, which they won 79–55 over Ukraine. In the quarterfinals, they defeated Latvia 103–97 and then the defending champion Spain, consisted of seven players from the NBA and five from the Spanish league, 92–72 in the semifinals to advance to their first-ever final against Serbia. Slovenia going undefeated (9–0) in the tournament after defeating Serbia 93–85. Goran Dragić was named the EuroBasket MVP. Despite a 9–0 run to win the EuroBasket 2017, Slovenia failed to qualify for the 2019 FIBA World Cup.

Boxing
 Boxer James J. Braddock was known as "The Cinderella Man". He was world heavyweight champion from 1935 to 1937.
 Mike Tyson vs. Buster Douglas (1990) – The undefeated and undisputed heavyweight champion Mike Tyson lost by knockout to 7th ranked and 42–1 underdog Buster Douglas.

Canadian football
 1989 Saskatchewan Roughriders – The Roughriders finished the season with a 9–9 record and made an improbable run to the 77th Grey Cup. The team went into the playoffs on a three-game losing streak, but upset the 10–8 Calgary Stampeders 33–26 in the West Division Semifinal before upsetting the heavily favoured Edmonton Eskimos (who finished the season with a 16–2 record) in the West Division Final, 32–21. This victory set up the Grey Cup game against the 12–6 Hamilton Tiger-Cats. Dave Ridgway's 26-yard field goal in the final minute gave the Riders a 43–40 victory, along with the franchise's first Grey Cup championship since 1966.
 2016 Ottawa Redblacks – The Redblacks, who had begun play in 2014, finished the 2016 regular season in first place in the East Division despite having an 8–9–1 record. Due to the CFL's crossover playoff format, the Redblacks were paired up with the Edmonton Eskimos in the East Division final; the Eskimos had won the 103rd Grey Cup against the Redblacks one season earlier. In shocking fashion, the Redblacks defeated the Eskimos 35–23 to advance to the 104th Grey Cup, where they would face the heavily favoured Calgary Stampeders. Ottawa would lead throughout most of the championship game, but Calgary kicker Rene Paredes kicked a field goal to tie the game at 33–33 with 22 seconds remaining, sending the game into overtime. In the overtime period, Ottawa quarterback Henry Burris threw a game-winning touchdown pass to Ernest Jackson to take a 39–33 lead; Calgary quarterback Bo Levi Mitchell threw three consecutive incomplete passes to end the game, which would result in the Redblacks winning their first championship title, therefore ending a 40-year championship drought for a major league sports franchise from the city of Ottawa.

Curling
 Italy (Stefania Constantini/Amos Mosaner) (2022 Winter Olympics - Mixed Double) – Italy, who had never achieved a single top four finish in any kind of curling world championship or Olympiad, won the gold medal undefeated with 11 straight wins thanks to an aggressive playstyle. During the tournament, they won 3 times with a 10+ score (against Czech Republic, Norway and Sweden) in the round-robin, beat Sweden in semifinals by 8-1 and won the final against Norway by 8–5.

Cycling
 Anna Kiesenhofer (2020 Summer Olympics – Women's individual road race) – Kiesenhofer, who turned pro in 2017, broke away from her group at the very start of the race along with four other riders. She won by 1' 15" over the silver medalist, Annemiek van Vleuten of the Netherlands. She celebrated after crossing the line, having mistakenly thought that all the breakaway riders had been caught and that she had won gold. Kiesenhofer's win was considered a major upset given that she trained for the event without a coach or a professional team, and was not viewed as a contender to win a medal.

Esports

Counter Strike: Global Offensive
 Cloud9 at the ELEAGUE Boston Major 2018 – The team made noticeable changes before the 2018 season, with longtime veterans Jordan "n0thing" Gilbert and Michael "shroud" Grzesiek leaving the roster in favour of Tarik "tarik" Celik and William "RUSH" Wierzba, both from OpTic Gaming. With the roster formed, Cloud9 had a strong start in the first Swiss formatted stage with a 3–0 record, but struggled in the second stage after losing to G2 Esports and Space Soldiers, the latter loss being a shocking upset. Facing a quick elimination from the tournament, the team picked up resounding wins against Virtus.pro, Astralis, and Vega Squadron to qualify to the playoffs with a 3–2 record. There, the team advanced to the grand finals, defeating G2 Esports and SK Gaming to face off against the European-region superteam FaZe Clan, who were undefeated throughout the tournament at the time. After FaZe Clan won the closely contested first game, Cloud9 struck back in the second game to force a deciding third game. During the third map, Inferno, Cloud9 forced a late comeback off the back of Jacky "Stewie2K" Yip's clutch play in the final round to guarantee overtime. Subsequently, Cloud9 secured their major win in dramatic fashion during double overtime, becoming the first North American team to win a Valve–sponsored major in CS:GO, a feat that remains unmatched in competitive Counter-Strike history. The series was lauded for its dramatic nature, as Cloud9 and other teams from the North American region were noted for their lackluster success in the Counter Strike scene leading up to the event.

Dota 2
 OG at The International 2018 – OG suffered multiple setbacks during qualifications in which three of its core members left for rival teams. Due to post-deadline roster changes, OG was no longer eligible to be directly invited to The International, nor its regional qualifiers and were required to play through the open qualifiers. Needing three new members just a few weeks before the open qualifiers began, OG quickly signed Topias "Topson" Taavitsainen, a newcomer to the scene who had never performed at a major LAN event, Sébastien "Ceb" Debs, retired professional player who had previously served as the team's coach and has not played at professional level for nearly 3 years, and Anathan "ana" Pham, returning to the team from a year-long break after their previous elimination at The International 2017. Finishing outside of the top eight in the Dota Pro Circuit final standings, which granted a direct invite to The International 2018, OG earned theirs by playing through and winning the European-region open qualifiers. Following their win at the European qualifiers, OG were then placed into group A, finishing fourth with a record of 9–7, which seeded them into the upper bracket. There, OG won every series to advance to the grand finals. Facing the lower bracket winner PSG.LGD in it, whom OG had just defeated in the upper bracket finals, OG won the game one, but lost the next two games. Needing another win to avoid losing the series, OG forced a late-game comeback in game four, and subsequently won game five, making them International champions and winning them over 11 million in prize money.OG would then go on to win The International 2019 with the same roster, becoming the first team to win two The Internationals and first team to win back to back The Internationals, a feat that remains unmatched in the history of Dota 2 esports.
 Team Spirit at The International 2021 – After failing to secure a direct invite to The International 2021, Team Spirit qualified for the event after edging out Team Empire in the Eastern European regional qualifiers 3–2.During the event, the team had a rough start to the group stage, but secured a spot in the upper bracket of the main event with a 10–6 record. There, the team faced off against Invictus Gaming, where they were sent to the lower bracket after a close 2–1 series. On the brink of elimination, the team made a miraculous run through the lower bracket, defeating Fnatic, the defending two-time champions OG, Virtus.pro, the team that sent Spirit to the lower bracket; Invictus Gaming, and Team Secret to face off against heavy favorites PSG.LGD in the grand final, who at the time had only dropped two games throughout the entire tournament. In the best-of-five series, Spirit won the first two games, but a counter to Magomed "Collapse" Khalilov's Magnus pick in game three, and a dominant performance in game four by PSG.LGD pushed the series to a game five. Although PSG.LGD were able to pick their strong combination of Tiny and Lycan during the draft phase, Spirit subsequently won the final game of the series to become The International champions, and the first Eastern European team to win an International since Natus Vincere in the inaugural International in 2011. As a result of the win, the team received 18 million in prize money, the largest purse awarded in esports.

League of Legends
 DRX at the 2022 League of Legends World Championship – DRX entered the World Championship as the LCK's fourth seed, having finished the LCK Summer split in sixth place with a 9–9 record. After being eliminated in the LCK Summer playoffs, they qualified for the World Championship via the Korean regional qualifiers by defeating KT Rolster and Liiv Sandbox; in both games, DRX was already down 2–1 in the best-of-five series, but managed to win both games 3–2 to clinch the LCK's fourth seed at the World Championship. At the tournament, DRX topped Group B of the play-in stage and advanced to the main group stage, where they once again topped the Group C with a 4–2 record and a group tiebreaker win over the LEC's Rogue. In the knockout stage, DRX first defeated defending world champions Edward Gaming in the quarter-finals after coming back from a 2–0 deficit in the best-of-five series, and then the LCK Summer split champions Gen.G in the semi-finals, becoming the first team in the history of the competition to reach the finals as a team that started in play-ins.In the finals, DRX faced T1 and their star player Lee "Faker" Sang-hyeok, who is regarded as one of the most recognizable players with three world titles. Prior to the World Championship Finals, DRX had 0 wins against T1 in the entire year. T1 were leading 2–1 in the final, however, DRX once again bounced back and won the match 3–2 to clinch their first world title. The victory also meant that Kim "Deft" Hyuk-kyu, who is regarded as one of the greatest players of all time, finally won the title after failing to do so on numerous occasions between 2014 and 2021, when he was always eliminated either in the quarter-finals or the semi-finals.

Golf
 Tiger Woods – Woods won the 2019 Masters Tournament by one shot, giving him his first major title in 11 years (and his first green jacket in 14 years) after mounting a historic comeback following personal scandal and countless debilitating injuries and surgeries. Because of his remarkable performance, Woods was awarded the Presidential Medal of Freedom by President Donald Trump.

Ice hockey

National Hockey League
 1937–38 Chicago Black Hawks – The Black Hawks would struggle with a 14–25–9 record. However, they earned a playoff spot, and in the first series, took on the Montreal Canadiens. Although they lost the first game of the series, the Hawks would win the next two games, including a shocker 3–2 OT victory at Montreal. Then, they faced the New York Americans. Like the first series, the Hawks would drop the opening game, before winning the next two games. In the Stanley Cup Finals, they took on the Toronto Maple Leafs. The Black Hawks won the first game before dropping the second game. Then the Hawks won the next two games to take home their second Stanley Cup. They are considered the biggest Cinderella story in NHL history and they became the first pro sports team to win a championship with a losing record.
 2003-04 Tampa Bay Lightning − The Lightning were coming off a 36-win season and a loss in the Eastern Conference Semifinals to the New Jersey Devils the year before. After putting up 46 wins in the regular season, the Lightning made just their 3rd Playoff appearance in franchise history. They then beat the New York Islanders in 5 games, the Montreal Canadiens in 4 games, and the Philadelphia Flyers in 7 games, to make their first Cup Final just 12 years into their existence. They would then beat the Calgary Flames in 7 games to win their first Stanley Cup, becoming the first team in the Southeastern United States to win it.
 2011–12 Los Angeles Kings – The Kings became the first eight seed of any conference to win the Stanley Cup. The Kings entered the 2012 Stanley Cup playoffs despite finishing with 95 points. In the first round, they defeated the first overall seed and Presidents' Trophy winning Vancouver Canucks in five games. They proceeded to sweep the second seed St. Louis Blues and eliminated the third seed Phoenix Coyotes in five games, going undefeated on the road in all three rounds. They started the finals against the New Jersey Devils by winning the first three games of the series. They lost games four and five to the Devils before winning game six and their first ever Stanley Cup championship in Los Angeles. They would go on to win the Stanley Cup once again two years later, which had them winning in seven games on the road three times, including being the fourth team in NHL history to overcome an 0–3 series deficit by doing so against their cross-state rival San Jose Sharks in the first round, and then the Anaheim Ducks and defending Stanley Cup champion Chicago Blackhawks, before beating the New York Rangers in five games to win their second title in franchise history and in three years.
 2018–19 St. Louis Blues – The Blues had a dismal start to the 2018–19 season that had them left in last place by the beginning of 2019. Throughout that time, the Blues made some drastic changes to their roster, namely firing head coach Mike Yeo and replacing him with Craig Berube, as well as experimenting with having rookie goaltender Jordan Binnington, fresh from their AHL farm team, the San Antonio Rampage, become the primary goaltender in place of Jake Allen. These decisions led to an unexpected reversal of fortune for the Blues, as Binnington won his first-ever professional start with a 3–0 win over the Philadelphia Flyers on January 7, and the Blues' confidence with his untapped potential eventually ignited an 11-game winning streak late into that month and cemented his place as primary goaltender for the rest of the season. Eventually, the Blues managed to earn 99 regular season points and clinch the position of third seed in the Central Division, qualifying for the Stanley Cup playoffs. The Blues then had to endure a long, difficult and sometimes uncertain playoff run against teams that held home-ice advantage and/or were more heavily favored Cup favorites, but they managed to hold their own against them by developing a mastery in road play, garnering a 10–3 record in visiting games. The Blues got caught in a 2–2 series tie in every round they played, including a potentially dooming 3–2 series hole in the second round, but their resolve to win prevailed, as they defeated their fellow division member Winnipeg Jets, outlasted the upper wild-card Dallas Stars, and avenged a conference finals defeat to the San Jose Sharks from three years prior to advance to play in the Stanley Cup Finals against the Boston Bruins. The Blues defeated the Bruins in seven games to finally win their first Stanley Cup in their 52 years in existence, ending the longest wait for a first championship for a team in NHL history as well as the tied-for-longest active Stanley Cup drought at the time and one of the longest in the league's history. In addition to earning his first shutoff win in a playoff game, Jordan Binnington became the first-ever rookie NHL goaltender to achieve the maximum number of wins in a playoff run, and Ryan O'Reilly, whom the Blues had acquired from Buffalo over the off-season, won the Conn Smythe Trophy for the playoff MVP, earning 23 points over 26 playoff games played.

International
 United States (1980 Winter Olympics)  – The American team, consisting entirely of amateur and collegiate players, won the Olympic gold medal. Along the way, they defeated the veteran and professional four-time defending champions Soviet Union by a score of 4–3 in a medal round game, an event known as the Miracle on Ice and widely considered to be one of the greatest U.S. sports achievements of the 20th century.
 Finland (2019 World Championship)  – Finland came in to the tournament with 18 first-timers, and with only two NHL players on the squad, which led to them being doubted by pundits all over the world. The Finns, however, placed second in their group, which pitted them against a Swedish team with 21 NHL players in the quarterfinals. The Finns eventually beat the Swedes 5–4 in overtime, which was followed up by a 1–0 shutout against a stacked, previously undefeated Russian team in the semifinal. Finally, the Finns defeated Canada 3–1 in the final to secure their third world championship in the most unlikely fashion.
 Canada (2021 World Championship) — Two years after losing to Finland in the final in 2019, and a year after the cancellation of the 2020 tournament due to the COVID-19 pandemic, the Canadians, led by the team's captain Adam Henrique, returned to the 2021 tournament facing seven teams in Group B. After losing their first three games, the Canadian team won three straight games before losing to the defending world champion Finland 3–2 in the shootout. They were so close to being eliminated in the preliminary round, but the Canadian team finished fourth in their group based on head-to-head victory over Kazakhstan (4–2), and made the playoffs. The Canadians upset the ROC team 2–1 in overtime in the quarterfinals, and then defeated the United States team 4–2 in the semifinals. Finally, the Canadians defeated the defending world champion Finland 3–2 in overtime in the final to win their 27th world championship in Canada's national team history.

Motorsport

24 Hours of Le Mans
 Ferrari 250 LM (1965 24 Hours of Le Mans) – As a result of a Ferrari's failed attempt to homologate the coupe version of the 250 P as a GT, the 250 LM was forced to run in the prototype class, thus was considered too heavy to be a contender against the works Ferraris and Fords. After the work cars of the factory teams failed to finish, the two Ferrari privateers took a one-two to the end with the under-competitive car in what became the marque's last victory.

Formula One
 Brawn GP – Prior to the 2009 Formula One season, Honda Racing F1 announced their withdrawal from Formula 1. It had been a fully factory supported team that had achieved lacklustre results despite a $300 million budget and staff of 700. A few weeks before the season was about to start, the team was subject to a management buyout by Ross Brawn and chief executive Nick Fry and was subsequently rebranded as Brawn GP. The team were not expected to be competitive following the loss of 270 jobs, necessary to ensure the team's survival and having only three cars available as opposed to eight in better funded teams. The team began its season with Jenson Button and Rubens Barrichello scoring a 1–2 victory respectively with Button starting from pole. The team then won 5 of the 6 following races, all by Button before the well funded and factory supported opposition began to catch-up. However, the team would hold on, and would win the Driver's Championship with Button and the Constructor's title.

Grand Prix motorcycle racing
 Team Suzuki ECSTAR – Prior to the 2020 MotoGP season, Suzuki won three races in the last Four seasons. Suzuki had fielded All-Spanish riders Joan Mir (Who became World Champion in 2020) and Alex Rins. In the start of the Season Alex Rins suffered shoulder injury during qualifying and then Joan Mir suffered an accident in lap 10 of Spanish Grand Prix. In Andalusian Grand Prix they finished fifth and tenth respectively. In Czech Grand Prix Rins placed 4th despite Mir collided by KTM's Iker Lecuona. In Austrian Grand Prix Joan Mir finished 2nd and made his first podium of this race. Styrian Grand Prix however they finished fourth and sixth respectively. San Marino Grand Prix that made Joan Mir second podium after finished third. Another race in Rimini Joan Mir made podium again after placed second of that race. Catalan Grand Prix that made Suzuki placed podium finish behind Frenchman Fabio Quartararo. In French Grand Prix They finished eleventh and sixteenth respectively despite Alex Rins finished race through pits. In Aragon Grand Prix The Spanish duo finished in the podium Rins placed first and Mir placed third. In the same circuit of the last round Suzuki made another podium finish, Rins placed second and Mir placed third. In European Grand Prix Joan Mir made first ever MotoGP win and Suzuki's 1–2 finish since the 1982 German Grand Prix. In Valencian Grand Prix Joan Mir and Suzuki secured their MotoGP title for the first time since Kenny Roberts Jr in 2000.

IFMAR World Championships
 Masami Hirosaka (1987 IFMAR 1:10 Electric 4WD Off-Road World Championship) – The virtually unknown Hirosaka arrived in competition as a privateer with an outdated Schumacher CAT and no factory representation unlike the rest of the championship contenders. During practice and qualifying, he managed to impress Schumacher's management with his driving; thus was loaned a car (CAT XL) favored by his competitors and was not yet available in his native Japan. Despite being near-stock (as opposed to the heavily modified cars of his well supported oppositions) with much of the running gear donated from his old car, Hirosaka managed to win his first (of fourteen) title.
 Tamiya (2002 IFMAR 1:10 ISTC World Championship) – Tamiya was better known for their R/C cars that catered to less than serious hobbyists in their 26 years of involvement. At the title contending A-main final of the event, Tamiya's title contention was led by an unknown Thai driver, Surikarn Chaidejsuriya, who was joined by a star studded line-up consisting of Masami Hirosaka, who had just claimed his title defense in 1:12 On-Road racing (and his 13th title); Barry Baker, the Top Qualifier; David Spashett, the multiple world champion who notably scored his 'triple' in 1998, and defending champion Atsushi Hara. Surikarn took the 3rd (and final) round win to claim the title after Baker, the round 1 winner, badly damaged his car in a crash. This win was credited for helping to improve Tamiya's image as a serious contender and as a brand.

World Rally Championship
 Paddy Hopkirk and Mini Cooper S (1964 Monte Carlo Rally) – Hopkirk's win was unexpected as his Mini Cooper S was the smallest and the least powerful car in the entry list and thus were not considered to be a contender. Hopkirk described his win over the large and powerful American cars as a 'David and Goliath' battle. His victory was the first of the hat trick of wins for the Minis.
 Jean-Pierre Nicolas (1978 Monte Carlo Rally) - Nicolas' privately entered Porsche 911 SC was not considered to be the favorites to the work efforts of the Lancia Stratoses, led by Sandro Munari (who was chasing his fourth consecutive win) and the Walter Röhrl and Bernard Darniche led Fiat-Abarth 131s. This was until snowstorm plagued the rally course prior to the start. As the rally progressed, the heavy snow favored the Michelins of the rear-engined Porsche and the works Group 2 front-driven, front wheel drive Renault 5 Alpines (whom he finished ahead of) over the Fiats and the Lancias; who were plagued with poor tire choices in earlier sessions. Also Nicolas' had only had reeced the course for three days in a Peugeot 104, unlike the work teams, who spent weeks preparing.
 Philippe Bugalski (1999 World Rally Championship) – Driving for part-timers Citroën Sport, Bugalski had scored his back to back wins at the Rally Catalunya and the Tour de Corse in his naturally aspirated, front-wheel-drive Citroën Xsara, beating the turbocharged 4WD championship contenders. These wins forced the 2 Litre World Cup class to be handicapped from the following season.

NASCAR 
 Tiny Lund in the 1963 Daytona 500  – part-timer Lund was given a ride by Marvin Panch's team, Wood Brothers Racing, in return of helping to save his life, after being been injured in an unrelated racing accident.
 Ron Bouchard in the 1981 Talladega 500  – running third to Darrell Waltrip and Terry Labonte on the last lap, Bouchard swooped under both of them as the pair battled side by side out of the final turn in a photo finish. After the race, Waltrip admitted to fail to notice him and did not block him as he believed that Bouchard was a lap down.
 Greg Sacks in the 1985 Pepsi Firecracker 400  –
 Derrike Cope in the 1990 Daytona 500 – 
 Alan Kulwicki in the 1992 NASCAR Winston Cup Series season - Alan Kulwicki entered the 1992 season in the Winston Cup Series with only 3 wins to his name in his Cup Series career, with the Wisconsin born owner-driver having a best points finish of 8th in 1990. He started off the season with a 4th-place finish in the 1992 Daytona 500, then spent his next 10 races racking up 5 top 10s, 2 top 5s and a win at Bristol Motor Speedway. He would score back-to-back top 5s shortly afterwards, including a win at Pocono Raceway, before slumping at Daytona and Talladega during the summer stretch. With a 34th-place finish resulting from a crash at the second race in Dover that put him 278 points away from the lead, Kulwicki rattled off 5 straight top 15 finishes, including 3 top 5s, to head into the 1992 Hooters 500 at Atlanta Motor Speedway in 2nd place in a legendary 6 driver battle for the Winston Cup.
Before the race, Kulwicki got permission from NASCAR to put two Mighty Mouse decals on the front of his car, more specifically the "TH" in "THUNDERBIRD"; his Ford Thunderbird was henceforth known as the "Underbird" due to Kulwicki being the only owner-driver in the championship battle, thus making him, in his eyes, the underdog. Kulwicki started 14th out of 41 cars, but had a broken gearbox early on in the race; the #7 would have to stay in 4th gear all day in order for the transmission to not completely break. Kulwicki would battle with NASCAR's most popular driver Bill Elliott for the Winston Cup after Davey Allison, who was the points leader heading into the race, was caught up in a crash on Lap 254. Elliott finished 1st but, due to Kulwicki leading one more lap than the #11 car (103 laps to 102), the #7 Hooters car finished 10 points ahead of Elliott to win the 1992 Winston Cup Series championship. As a result, Kulwicki became the first driver born above the Mason-Dixon line, as well as the first owner-driver since Richard Petty in 1979, to win the Winston Cup.
Kulwicki would pass away after an airplane crash on April 1, 1993.
 Trevor Bayne in the 2011 Daytona 500 – Racing in only his second NASCAR Sprint Cup Series start, Trevor Bayne went on to survive the wreck-filled race and win the race. Mike Joy, veteran NASCAR commentator, is heard saying "Cinderella's Glass slipper! (...?)", a direct reference to Cinderella stories in themselves. Bayne had just turned 20 the day before.

Rugby union

Pro12
 Connacht (2015–16) – Traditionally the "weak sister" of Ireland's four provincial sides, having nearly been shuttered by the Irish Rugby Football Union in 2004 and never finishing higher than seventh in Pro12 prior to 2015–16, Connacht finished the home-and-away season level on points with traditional power Leinster atop the table (with Leinster claiming the top play-off seed on a tiebreaker) and went on to claim their first-ever title with a convincing win over Leinster in the final.

Snooker
 Joe Johnson – Johnson won the 1986 World Snooker Championship as a rank outsider, having never won a match in his previous appearances at the tournament.
 Stuart Bingham – Bingham won the 2015 World Snooker Championship after being seen as a journeyman for much of his career.

Short track speed skating
 Steven Bradbury at 2002 Winter Olympics – the 1000 metre event is remembered for the victory of Australian Steven Bradbury, who benefited from all four other skaters in the final going down ahead of him, while Bradbury stayed on his feet and won gold. It was the first ever Winter Olympics gold medal for Australia.

Sumo
 Terunofuji Haruo (2020 in sumo) – In 2017, through a series of injuries; Terunofuji began his descent from his ōzeki rank (the 2nd highest rank in sumo) to by 2019, the jonidan division (the 2nd lowest division). It was after this, he began his ascent back to the makuuchi division (the highest division in professional sumo); winning division titles and losing one in a playoff. He earned his promotion back to the top division at the March  but as a result of the pandemic which caused the cancellation of the Natsu basho, he had to wait until July for his return. He won 13 bouts to secure his second career career top division yūshō on his return to the top division. He earned his second promotion to ōzeki following a third championship win in March 2021, which he immediately followed with another tournament championship in May 2021. Following a runner-up performance in the July 2021 tournament, he was promoted to become the sport's 73rd yokozuna. Sumo commentator John Gunning has regarded Terunofuji's comeback "a tale unparalleled in sumo history."

Tennis
 1994 US Open – Andre Agassi became the first unseeded player in the Open Era (1968–) to win the championship.
 2001 Wimbledon – Goran Ivanišević, a three-time runner-up (1992, 1994, 1998), won the title despite being ranked 125th and only entering the tournament by a wild card.
 2002 US Open – Pete Sampras, who was seeded 17th, won his last ever professional match to capture a then-record extending 14th Major, beating long-time rival Andre Agassi in the final.
 2017 Australian Open – 17th seed Roger Federer, who was aged 35, defeated long-time rival Rafael Nadal in a five-set final for his first Major tournament victory in five years.
 2021 US Open – 18-year-old Emma Raducanu defeated fellow teenager Leylah Fernandez in the final, becoming the first qualifier to win a Major title. Raducanu did not lose a set throughout the entire tournament.
 2022 Australian Open  – Rafael Nadal, aged 35 and returning from a six-month injury hiatus and infection by COVID-19 that made him consider retirement, defeated Daniil Medvedev in a five-set final to win a record-breaking 21st Major title.

Examples of Cinderellas that did not win the championship
These Cinderellas made it to the finals/playoffs in their respective leagues, but they were unable to win the championship.

American football

National Football League
 1972 Pittsburgh Steelers – In Chuck Noll's 4th season as head coach, the Steelers finished 11–3 and qualified for the NFL playoffs as the AFC Central winner. It was the Steelers' first playoff appearance since 1962 and their second-ever appearance since 1947. During the divisional round, the Steelers played the Oakland Raiders and were leading 6–0 until the Raiders scored a touchdown late in the 4th quarter to take the lead 7–6. Facing a 4th-and-10 on their own 40 yard line, Steelers quarterback Terry Bradshaw threw towards halfback John "Frenchy" Fuqua, when Raiders safety Jack Tatum collided with Fuqua. However, Steelers fullback Franco Harris picked up the deflected ball and took it in for a touchdown. This play, later dubbed the "Immaculate Reception", helped the Steelers win 13–7 and get their first playoff victory. The Steelers would advance to the AFC championship game, but lost 21–17 to the undefeated Miami Dolphins.
 1975 Dallas Cowboys – Finishing 10–4, the Cowboys qualified for the NFL playoffs as the NFC wildcard seed. During the divisional round, they defeated the defending NFC champion Minnesota Vikings 17–14 in the now-famous "Hail Mary" game, then beat the Los Angeles Rams 37–7 in the NFC championship game and became the first wildcard team to reach the Super Bowl. They would lose Super Bowl X to the defending Super Bowl champion Pittsburgh Steelers by a score of 21–17.
 1985 New England Patriots – The Patriots were able to improve on their 9–7 record from 1984 and finished with an 11–5 record in 1985. Despite starting the year 2–3, they were able to win 9 of their next 11 to barely make the playoffs as the 5th seed with an 11–5 record. However, they won road playoff games against the division rival New York Jets and the number one seed Los Angeles Raiders to advance to the AFC championship game on the road against the heavily favored rival Miami Dolphins. They shocked the world by winning, and became the first team in NFL history to make it to the Super Bowl by winning 3 consecutive road playoff games. However, the actual Super Bowl would not be close, with the Bears trouncing the Patriots 46–10.
 1987 Minnesota Vikings – The Vikings finished the 1987 strike-shortened NFL season with a mediocre 8–7 record and barely qualified for the NFL playoffs as the final seed. They went to New Orleans to play the New Orleans Saints in the first ever playoff game for the Saints, and won the game by a score of 44–10. The next week, the Vikings went to San Francisco to play the number one seeded San Francisco 49ers. Despite being heavy underdogs, the Vikings defeated the 49ers by a score of 36–24, advancing to the NFC Championship Game. However, the Vikings were unable to pull off a third consecutive upset, as they lost to the Washington Redskins by a score of 17–10.
 1994 San Diego Chargers – Finishing 11–5, the Chargers qualified for the No. 2 AFC seed in the NFL playoffs. After 2 comeback wins during the playoffs, a 22–21 win against the Miami Dolphins in the divisional round, and a 17–13 win against the Pittsburgh Steelers in the conference championship, the Chargers would make their first Super Bowl appearance at Super Bowl XXIX, but lost 49–26 to the San Francisco 49ers. As of 2020, this has been the Chargers' only Super Bowl appearance and their sole appearance as a San Diego-based franchise before relocating to Los Angeles after the 2016 season.
 1996 Jacksonville Jaguars – Entering their 2nd season as an expansion team, the Jacksonville Jaguars started the season with a 4–7 record following a 28–3 loss against the Pittsburgh Steelers, resulting in wide receiver Andre Rison being released from the team following a miscommunication with quarterback Mark Brunell. The Jaguars would win out beginning with a 28–25 overtime victory against the Baltimore Ravens to finish the regular season with a 9–7 record and clinch the playoffs. In the playoffs, the Jaguars defeated the 3rd-seeded Buffalo Bills and would later upset the heavily favored, top-seeded Denver Broncos, who were led by quarterback John Elway. Their season ended in the AFC Championship game following a 20–6 defeat against the 2nd-seeded New England Patriots, who would go on to lose against the eventual champions, the Green Bay Packers.
 1999 Tennessee Titans – The Titans had just changed their team name from "Oilers" to "Titans" and had finished 13–3 and in second place in the AFC Central, their best record since 1993 when they were based in Houston and their first winning record under Jeff Fisher. In the NFL playoffs, they memorably defeated the Buffalo Bills. The Titans then defeated the 13–3 Indianapolis Colts, led by sophomore quarterback Peyton Manning in the AFC divisional round, and then defeated their division rival Jacksonville Jaguars 33–14 in the AFC Championship Game. With that win, the Titans became the only team to defeat the Jaguars during the season, having done so three times. After many years of playoff disappointments during the club's time as the Houston Oilers, the Titans advanced to play in Super Bowl XXXIV, but their season came to an end with a 23–16 loss to the St. Louis Rams, who themselves had won their first championship since 1951. The game was highly known for its ending, known as "The Tackle", as Titans wide receiver Kevin Dyson was tackled by Rams linebacker Mike Jones, preventing a touchdown to potentially tie the game.
 2002 Oakland Raiders – A year after they infamously lost to the eventual champion New England Patriots in the Tuck Rule Game in last year's Divisional Round, the Raiders hired their offensive coordinator, Bill Callahan as their new head coach. The Raiders had started the season 4–0, but the team's hot start would be followed by a 4-game losing streak; the team's 4–4 record stunned many onlookers. Oakland, however, redeemed itself by winning seven of its final eight contests. In the third quarter of Oakland's 26–20 win on Monday Night Football over the New York Jets, wide receiver Tim Brown (whom had been with the Raiders since they were based in Los Angeles) became the third player in NFL history with 1,000 career catches. Finishing 11–5 and winning the AFC West division title for the third consecutive year, the Raiders defeated the Jets and the Titans to advance to play in Super Bowl XXXVII against the Tampa Bay Buccaneers, whom were led by their former coach, Jon Gruden. It was the Raiders' first Super Bowl since Super Bowl XVIII when they were based in Los Angeles. However, Oakland lost 48–21 to Tampa Bay, who won their first title in franchise history. Until 2016, this was the Raiders' last time qualifying to play in the playoffs, and as of the conclusion of the 2018 season, this is the most recent season in which the Raiders have won a playoff game.
 2002 Cleveland Browns – Three years since returning to the NFL following a controversial relocation, the Browns finished 9–7 and made the NFL playoffs for the first time since 1994. In the wildcard round, they faced their division rivals Pittsburgh Steelers but lost 36–33.
 2003 Carolina Panthers – The Panthers, just two seasons after holding the league's worst record at 1–15 (their lone win being their season opener vs. the Minnesota Vikings), finished the 2003 season at 11–5, clinching their second playoff appearance in franchise history. The Panthers defeated the Dallas Cowboys, the St. Louis Rams in double OT, and the Philadelphia Eagles to qualify to play in Super Bowl XXXVIII against the New England Patriots. Led by sophomore coach John Fox, the Panthers and Patriots were tied during the last minutes of the game 29–29 until Patriots kicker Adam Vinatieri delivered a game-winning field goal as time expired, handing New England their second title in three years.
 2004 St. Louis Rams – Despite finishing with a mediocre 8–8 record, the Rams qualified for the NFL playoffs for the fifth time in six years. They were able to sweep their division rival Seattle Seahawks both in the regular season and in the NFC wild card round, before falling to the Atlanta Falcons 47–17 in the NFC divisional round. This was the club's final playoff appearance in St. Louis, as the Rams failed to qualify for the playoffs again until 2017, when the franchise returned to Los Angeles. Statistics site Football Outsiders calculates that the 2004 Rams were, play-for-play, the worst team to make the playoffs in the site's rating history.
 2005 Seattle Seahawks – Three years after getting placed in the NFC West (where they'd been in their inaugural 1976 season), the Seahawks finished a franchise-best 13–3 and qualified for the top seed in the NFL playoffs. During the divisional round, the Seahawks beat the Washington Redskins 20–10 to win their first playoff game since 1984, and with a 34–14 win against the Carolina Panthers in the conference championship, Seattle would advance to their first Super Bowl. They would lose 21–10 to the Pittsburgh Steelers at Super Bowl XL in a game which was subject to questionable officiating.
 2006 New Orleans Saints – Since their establishment in 1967, the Saints had experienced many years of mediocrity, not qualifying for the playoffs until 1987 and not winning a single one until 2000. The Saints were coming off a 3–13 record and the city of New Orleans came off the destruction of Hurricane Katrina, which caused all of New Orleans' sports teams (including the Saints) to evacuate their home stadiums; the NBA's New Orleans Hornets temporarily moved to Oklahoma City and played there until the 2007–08 season. The Saints had hired Cowboys assistant head coach Sean Payton as their new head coach and signed former San Diego Chargers quarterback Drew Brees, the 32nd overall pick in the 2001 draft to a six-year deal. With many suspecting that his career was over, Brees was coming off a career-threatening shoulder injury he suffered at the end of the 2005 season that resulted him to be released by the Chargers and received interest by both the Miami Dolphins and Saints to sign Brees. Finishing 10–6 and clinching a first-round bye for the first time ever, the Saints enjoyed their most successful season at the time (later surpassed by the 2009, 2011 and 2018 seasons), defeating the Philadelphia Eagles 27–24 in the NFC divisional round before losing 39–14 to the Chicago Bears in the NFC Championship Game. It was only the Saints' second time winning a playoff game and their first time appearing in an NFC Championship Game. The signing of Brees in March 2006 is believed by many as the greatest free agency signing in NFL history, tied with the Denver Broncos' signing of Peyton Manning 6 years later and the Tampa Bay Buccaneers' signing of Tom Brady 14 years later.
 2008 Arizona Cardinals – The Cardinals had experienced many years of failure for much of the 20th century, not winning a single playoff game until 1998 and prior to that, qualified for the playoffs only 3 times since winning the NFL Championship in 1947. 2008 was an up and down year for the Cardinals, being blown out in a week 4 matchup against the New York Jets, recording 7 turnovers in a 56–35 loss, while in a week 16 match up against the New England Patriots, the Cardinals lost 47–7, despite the Patriots losing starter Tom Brady to a season-ending injury in the season opener. And finally, after many years of mediocrity in their 88-year existence, the Cardinals returned to the NFL playoffs for the first time in ten years with a 9–7 record (by virtue of winning the NFC West division title.) The Cardinals defeated the Atlanta Falcons 30–24 in overtime during the Wild Card round, the Carolina Panthers 33–13 in the Divisional Round, and the Philadelphia Eagles 32–25 in the NFC championship game and advanced to play in Super Bowl XLIII against the Pittsburgh Steelers. It was the Cardinals' first time winning a playoff game at home since their 1947 championship-winning season, and only their second time winning a playoff game in franchise history. During the fourth quarter of Super Bowl XLIII, the Cardinals nearly pulled off a comeback win, coming from behind 20–7 to take a 23–20 lead, until Steelers wide receiver Santonio Holmes delivered a game-winning touchdown catch with less than a minute left to win the Steelers their sixth title in franchise history, and the Cardinals were unable to end their championship drought dating back to 1947. After Major League Baseball's Chicago Cubs ended their 108-year championship drought by winning the 2016 World Series, the Cardinals currently hold the longest championship drought in the five major sports leagues in North America as of 2019.
 2008 Miami Dolphins – The Dolphins came off a league-worst 1–15 season that almost made them the first 0–16 team in the NFL, possibly due to the resignation of head coach Nick Saban, the Dolphins passing on quarterback Drew Brees, and the arrest of several players such as Fred Evans and Kelly Campbell. Miami hired Dallas Cowboys assistant head coach Tony Sparano as their new head coach, replacing the fired Cam Cameron. Under their rookie head coach, the Dolphins started the season 0–2, but then used the Wildcat formation to upset the New England Patriots on the road during Week 3, snapping their 20-game regular season winning streak that dated back to December 10, 2006, in which ironically, they were also beaten by the Dolphins. The Dolphins finished 11–5 and qualified for the NFL playoffs as the third seed in the AFC, and won the AFC East, making them the only team in the NFL to win their division after winning only one game the season before. Despite the surprising turnaround, the Dolphins would fall to the Baltimore Ravens in the AFC wild card round by a score of 27–9. Newly acquired quarterback Chad Pennington was named NFL Comeback Player of the Year and was tied for second for the 2008 AP NFL MVP with Atlanta Falcons running back Michael Turner.
 2010 New York Jets – The Jets improved on their 9–7 record from last season, but failed to win their division for the first time since 2002, losing to the top-seeded New England Patriots for the AFC East title. In a rematch of last year's AFC Championship Game, the Jets defeated the Indianapolis Colts on the road, ending the Colts' Peyton Manning era. The Jets would also defeat the Patriots on the road (whom they lost to earlier in the season 45–3), and nearly defeated the Pittsburgh Steelers on the road in the AFC Championship Game, which ended their hopes of joining the 2005 Steelers, 2007 Giants, and 2010 Packers as the only NFL teams to win three straight playoff games on the road. They also failed to make their first Super Bowl since 1968, as well as play in the first Super Bowl between number 6 seeds. The 2010 Jets were led by the sophomore duo of Rex Ryan and Mark Sanchez.
 2011 Detroit Lions – Three years after suffering the first 0–16 season in NFL history, Detroit finished 10–6 and made the NFL playoffs for the first time since 1999. Led by head coach Jim Schwartz and quarterback Matthew Stafford, both of whom joined the team in 2009, Detroit posted their first winning season since 2000 and their first 10-win season since 1995, setting the new franchise record for most points scored at 474. Despite these successes, the Lions fell to the New Orleans Saints 45–28 in the wildcard round, extending Detroit's playoff win drought, having last won a playoff game in the 1991–92 NFL playoffs.
 2012 San Francisco 49ers – After quarterback Steve Young's departure in 2000, the 49ers would make two more playoff appearances in 2001 and 2002 before spending the rest of the decade struggling, never finishing better than 0.500. In 2011, the 49ers hired former Stanford head coach Jim Harbaugh, who led the team to a 13–3 season and the No. 2 NFC seed at the NFL playoffs, defeating the New Orleans Saints 36–32 in the divisional round before losing 20–17 in overtime to the eventual Super Bowl XLVI champion New York Giants in the NFC Championship Game. In 2012, the 49ers started 6–2 before quarterback Alex Smith was injured, eventually prompting quarterback Colin Kaepernick, who was drafted in 2011, to step in and finish out the season 11–4–1, earning the No. 2 NFC seed at the NFL Playoffs once again. During the playoffs, they defeated the Green Bay Packers 45–31 in the divisional round and the Atlanta Falcons 28–24 at the NFC Championship Game, overcoming a 24–14 deficit, and advanced to their first Super Bowl in 18 years. They narrowly lost Super Bowl XLVII to the Baltimore Ravens by a score of 34–31, also losing their place as the sole NFL team to stay undefeated in multiple Super Bowls.
 2016 Green Bay Packers – After posting a 4–6 record through 10 games, star QB Aaron Rodgers led the Packers on one of the greatest in-season runs in NFL history to finish the season 10–6 and as division champions. Post-Week 11, Green Bay ran the table, riding an eight-game win streak into the playoffs all the way to the NFC Championship Game. Along the way, they defeated the 11–5 New York Giants and downed the No. 1 seeded 13–3 Dallas Cowboys on the road with some late-game heroics. While they ultimately fell to the Atlanta Falcons in the conference championship, their comeback in the second half of the season is still regarded as one of the most sudden turnarounds ever.
 2016 Atlanta Falcons – The Falcons entered the NFL playoffs for the first time in four years with an 11–5 record and easily defeated the Seattle Seahawks and Green Bay Packers to advance to play in Super Bowl LI against the New England Patriots. Despite holding a 25-point lead nearly midway through the third quarter, they ultimately squandered their chance to win the Super Bowl by blowing that lead, losing the coin toss for what would become the first-ever overtime period in a Super Bowl, and finally allowing a touchdown. The Falcons lost Super Bowl LI to the Patriots by a score of 34–28.
 2017 Buffalo Bills – Last making the playoffs in 1999, the Bills had struggled in the 21st century, only coming close to playoff contention three times in that span. Despite inconsistent performances throughout the season, the Bills clinched their first winning record since 2014 and clinched a playoff berth for the first time since Buffalo Bills in the final week of the regular season after a win over the Miami Dolphins, plus the Cincinnati Bengals defeating the Baltimore Ravens and ended an 18-year playoff drought. As the sixth seed in the playoffs, the Bills faced the Jacksonville Jaguars in the Wild Card round, where they lost 10–3.
 2017 Jacksonville Jaguars – The Jaguars returned to the playoffs for the first time in 10 years and finished 10–6. Jacksonville qualified for the NFL playoffs as the AFC's number 3 seeded team. Led by first-year head coach Doug Marrone, the Jaguars defeated the Buffalo Bills 10–3 in the AFC wild-card round. The Jaguars would then defeat their former divisional rival Pittsburgh Steelers 45–42 on the road in the AFC divisional round. In the AFC Championship Game, the Jaguars nearly defeated the defending Super Bowl champion New England Patriots on the road. The Jaguars led 20–10 during the fourth quarter, but ultimately gave up two fourth-quarter touchdowns, and lost the game 24–20. It was the Jaguars' first AFC Championship Game appearance since 1999 and they failed to become the first team since the 2012 Baltimore Ravens to upset the Patriots on the road in the postseason.
 2018 Indianapolis Colts – The Colts qualified to play in the NFL playoffs for the first time since 2014 (their last postseason game being the infamous Deflategate game) with a 10–6 record. They were predicted to be the worst team in the AFC South division and started the season 1–5. They would win all but one of their games after that, the lone loss being a 6–0 loss against the Jacksonville Jaguars on the road in Week 13, making it possible for Andrew Luck, who was coming off a one-year injury, to compete in the playoffs. In the NFL playoffs, the Colts defeated the division rival Houston Texans 21–7 on the road in the AFC wild-card round, before losing to the Kansas City Chiefs 31–13 in the AFC divisional round. This season also marked the end of an era for the Colts, as Andrew Luck announced his retirement on August 24, 2019, after playing only 7 years in the league.
 2018 Philadelphia Eagles – A year after winning their first Super Bowl title over the New England Patriots, the Eagles had hopes of defending such title and winning consecutive Super Bowls for the first time since the Patriots did so in the 2004 season. Quarterback Carson Wentz, whom was sidelined during the final weeks of the 2017 season, returned from injury in Week 3 of the 2018 season. Additional injuries to key players and overall inconsistencies prevented the Eagles from executing fully, and they began the season 4–6, failing to improve on their 13–3 record from the preceding season. They were dealt some particularly horrifying losses in said start, topped off by a 48–7 loss to the New Orleans Saints on the road, which is the worst loss any defending Super Bowl champion has been dealt in NFL history. Not only did this leave their postseason hopes in grave peril, but they were on the brink of becoming the worst defending Super Bowl champions of all time. And facing the hardest remaining schedule in the league, they were heavily predicted to complete said collapse. Furthermore, a back injury after Week 14 bumped Wentz down as the Number 3 quarterback instead of being placed on the injured reserve, and reigning Super Bowl MVP Nick Foles would start for the remainder of the season. They upset the drastically favored Los Angeles Rams and won out to make the playoffs. From there, the Eagles upset the favored 3rd seeded Chicago Bears in the Wild Card round, and in the divisional round nearly defeated the top-seeded aforementioned Saints, again on the road, as the Eagles led 14–0 during the 1st quarter, which would have been the Saints' first playoff loss at home since 1992 and the first in the Sean Payton/Drew Brees era.
 2019 Green Bay Packers – After two disappointing seasons (including an injury-plagued 2017 season and the 2018 season which quarterback Aaron Rodgers later revealed he played with a sprained MCL), and firing their head coach Mike McCarthy after 12 years, the Packers were not expected to fare much better in 2019. They hired Tennessee Titans offensive coordinator Matt LaFleur as their new head coach, the 15th head coach in franchise history. After finishing 13–3 for the first time since 2007 (which was also Brett Favre's final year with the Packers), the Packers won the NFC North for the first time in 3 years and in the playoffs, defeated the Seattle Seahawks 28–23 but in the NFC Championship Game, lost to the San Francisco 49ers, their 3rd playoff loss to the Niners in 8 years, and ending their hopes of returning to the Super Bowl for the first time in 9 years.
 2019 San Francisco 49ers – The 49ers had been in misery since former head coach Jim Harbaugh left the team to coach Michigan following the 2014 season. Coming off a 4–12 record, the Niners would begin the season 8–0 for the first time since 1990, during the Joe Montana/Jerry Rice era. 3rd-year quarterback Jimmy Garoppolo, whom the Niners traded from the New England Patriots for a 2018 second-round pick, was coming off a torn ACL he suffered during Week 3 of the 2018 season. The Niners would finish the season 13–3 in the playoffs, they defeated the Minnesota Vikings 27–10 in the divisional round and the Green Bay Packers 37–20 in the NFC Championship Game to make their first Super Bowl since the 2012 season. The Niners ultimately lost to the Kansas City Chiefs in Super Bowl LIV 31–20 despite holding a 20–10 fourth-quarter lead, ending their hopes of joining the Pittsburgh Steelers and Patriots as the only teams to win 6 Super Bowl titles; the loss gave Kansas City their second Super Bowl win and their first NFL championship title. Kansas City's victory helped reduce the impact of the COVID-19 pandemic in San Francisco; had the Niners won the game, the number of deaths in the early days of the pandemic would have been larger.
 2019 Tennessee Titans – The Titans came off a 9–7 season in which they missed the playoffs and their first under head coach Mike Vrabel, whom previously served as Linebackers coach and defensive coordinator for the Houston Texans and played as a linebacker for the Pittsburgh Steelers, New England Patriots, and Kansas City Chiefs from 1997 to 2010. The Titans began the season 2–4, and following a 16–0 shutout loss to the Denver Broncos in Week 6, head coach Vrabel chose to bench quarterback Marcus Mariota, the 2nd overall pick in the 2015 Draft in favor for backup Ryan Tannehill, whom the Titans traded for from the Dolphins during the offseason. Tannehill performed well going 7–2 at the helm, and qualified for the playoffs as the 6th seed in the AFC. In the playoffs the Titans defeated the defending Super Bowl champion New England Patriots on the road 20–13 (their first win at Gillette Stadium since 1993), the heavily favored number 1 seed Baltimore Ravens 28–12 in the Divisional Round, ultimately losing to the eventual Super Bowl champion Kansas City Chiefs in the AFC Championship Game 35–24, ending their hopes of returning to the Super Bowl for the first time in 20 years, or Ryan Tannehill returning to Hard Rock Stadium (the site of Super Bowl LIV) since the Dolphins traded him to the Titans.
 2020 Cleveland Browns – After last making the playoffs in 2002, the Browns would suffer 18 years of futility only having one winning season, going through multiple starting quarterbacks and head coaches, and going on a 1–31 stretch including a winless season in 2017. Following a 6–10 record from the previous season, the Browns fired head coach Freddie Kitchens and named Kevin Stefanski as their new head coach and named Andrew Berry as their new general manager. With Stefanski plus third-year quarterback Baker Mayfield, the Browns finished the season at 11–5, their best record since 1994, and clinched the number 6 seed in the postseason. In the playoffs, the Browns upset the Pittsburgh Steelers 48–37 after scoring 28 points in the first quarter alone following miscues from the Steelers. The win was the Browns first playoff win since 1994, their first road playoff win since 1969, and snapped a 17-game losing streak in Pittsburgh which dated back to 2003. However the Browns would lose to the defending Super Bowl LIV champions and eventual AFC Champions Kansas City Chiefs in the Divisional Round 22–17.
 2021 San Francisco 49ers – Despite the 49ers starting 3–5, they finished the season on a 7–2 run,  finishing the season with a 10–7 record and qualified for the playoffs after a one-year absence as the number six seed, in a comeback win over the Los Angeles Rams in Week 18. The 49ers began their playoff run by defeating the Dallas Cowboys 23–17 in the Wild Card round. They then stunned the top-seeded Green Bay Packers 13–10 in the Divisional Round following a strong performance by the defense and special teams. However, their season came to an end with a 20–17 defeat against the eventual Super Bowl champion Rams in the NFC Championship Game, despite building a 17–7 fourth quarter lead.
 2021 Cincinnati Bengals – The Bengals had struggled greatly since the 2015 season, including going on a 6-25-1 stretch between 2019-2020. Despite entering the 2021 season with little expectations, the Bengals, led by 2020 first overall pick Joe Burrow, Joe Mixon, Ja'Marr Chase, and third year coach Zac Taylor, finished the season with a 10–7 record, good enough to win the AFC North, and returned to the playoffs for the first time since 2015. As the number 4 seed, the Bengals began their playoff run by defeating the Las Vegas Raiders 26–19 in the Wild Card round, winning their first playoff game since 1990, and ending what was the NFL's longest playoff win drought. The Bengals then upset the top-seeded Tennessee Titans 19–16 in the Divisional Round following an Evan McPherson go ahead field goal. This marked the Bengals first-ever road playoff win and allowed them to advance to the AFC Championship Game for the first time since 1988. Then, in the AFC Championship Game against the defending AFC Champion Kansas City Chiefs, the Bengals rallied after being down 21–3 early, winning 27–24 in overtime on another McPherson game-winning field goal, advancing to Super Bowl LVI, their third Super Bowl in franchise history and first in 33 years. However, they lost to the Los Angeles Rams 23–20 on the Rams' home field of SoFi Stadium, despite being the designated "home" team.
 2022 Seattle Seahawks – After finishing the season 7-10 the previous season and trading away franchise quarterback Russell Wilson to the Denver Broncos in March 2022, the Seahawks weren't expected to compete in the NFC. After naming backup Geno Smith as the starter, the Seahawks surprised many as they began the season 6–3, finishing the season with a 9–8 record and returning to the playoffs after a one-year absence after a win over the Los Angeles Rams in the final week of the regular season, and a Detroit Lions win over the Green Bay Packers later that day. However the Seahawks lost to their rival the San Francisco 49ers in the Wild Card round, falling 41–23 despite being up 17–16 at halftime.
 2022 Jacksonville Jaguars – After last making the playoffs in 2017, Jacksonville would struggle in the next four years, including a 1–15 season in 2020, and a 3–14 season in 2021 where the Jaguars had a turmoil season due to being in constant headlines for repeated scandals involving the team. Despite starting the season 3–7 in 2022, the Jags, led by 2021 first overall pick Trevor Lawrence and Super Bowl winning coach Doug Pederson had a midseason turnaround, winning six of their next seven games to finish the regular season 9–8, win the AFC South division, and return to the playoffs for the first time since 2017. In the Wild Card round, Jacksonville rallied from a 27–0 deficit to defeat the Los Angeles Chargers 31–30 for the largest comeback in franchise history and the third-largest in NFL postseason history. In the divisional round, the Jaguars lost to the eventual Super Bowl champion Kansas City Chiefs 27–20.
 2022 New York Giants – Since their Super Bowl XLVI victory in 2011, the Giants had struggled the next 11 years, only making the postseason once, and going on a 19–45 span between 2017-2021. After firing head coach Joe Judge and general manager Dave Gettleman retiring, the Giants hired former Bills offensive coordinator Brian Daboll and former Bills front office assistant Joe Schoen. With the two, including fourth-year quarterback Daniel Jones and fifth-year running back Saquon Barkley, the Giants finished the season with a 9–7–1 record, having their first winning season and making the playoffs for the first time since 2016. The Giants began their postseason run by stunning the 13–4 Minnesota Vikings 31–24 in the Wild Card round, winning their first playoff game since their aforementioned Super Bowl victory. However the next week they lost to the top-seeded rival Philadelphia Eagles in the Divisional round, 38–7.

College
 Auburn Tigers (2013) – After a disappointing 3–9 season in 2012, the Tigers came out of nowhere to win the SEC Championship. Their most memorable plays include a tipped Hail Mary pass that was caught by Ricardo Louis for a touchdown to beat Georgia and a Chris Davis touchdown return off a missed 57-yard field goal against Alabama as time expired in what is known as the "Kick Six". Auburn eventually reached the BCS Championship Game, but lost to Florida State 34–31 on a last-minute touchdown pass.
 Western Michigan Broncos (2016) – This was a historic season for the Broncos. They were led by fourth-year head coach P. J. Fleck and played their home games at Waldo Stadium as a member of the West Division of the Mid-American Conference (MAC). Led by senior offensive weapons Zach Terrell and future 1st round pick Corey Davis, the Broncos completed their regular season undefeated and won the MAC West Division title. The Broncos finished conference play defeating the Ohio Bobcats 29–23 in the 2016 MAC Championship Game, winning the school's first MAC championship title since 1988. WMU received an invitation to the 2017 Cotton Bowl as the highest rated Group of Five team in the College Football Playoff (CFP). It was the first New Years Six bowl appearance in school history (and second for a MAC team). The Broncos also won 10 games in a season for the first time in their 111-year football history. They lost to the No. 8 Wisconsin Badgers in the game, 24–16. This season marked the last season at WMU for Fleck, as he would depart to be the new head coach of Minnesota.
 Michigan Wolverines (2021) –  Coming off a terrible COVID-shortened 2020 season, Michigan had a 0% chance at betting odds to make the National Championship Game, let alone the Big Ten Championship Game. However, they defied the odds and went 12-1 overall and 8-1 for conference play, winning the Big Ten East Division by beating rival Ohio State 42–27 to end an eight-game losing skid to the Buckeyes. The Wolverines faced off against Iowa in the 2021 Big Ten Championship Game. They defeated the No. 23 Hawkeyes, 42–3 to qualify for that year's CFP. The run to defy the odds once more by going to the National Championship Game was stopped by a 34–11 loss to the eventual champion Georgia Bulldogs at the Orange Bowl.
 Cincinnati Bearcats (2021) - The Cincinnati Bearcats football team had seen consistent winning seasons in the American Athletic Conference under fifth-year head coach Luke Fickell, though as a Group of Five team, they had not received recognition as a national contender. After a loss in the Peach Bowl to the Georgia Bulldogs, the Bearcats had +15000 odds to win the national championship, and they debuted at 8 in the preseason AP poll. Cincinnati defeated Notre Dame on the road in Week 5, 24-13, and then won their second conference championship in a row, 35-20 against Houston. They finished at 4 in the CFP rankings, which made them the first Group of Five team to receive an invitation to the College Football Playoff. They lost to one-seed Alabama in the Cotton Bowl, 27-6.
 TCU Horned Frogs (2022) – In 2021, TCU was coming off a dismal 5–7 season, and against all odds bookmakers listed them 200–1 to win the National Championship. However, first-season coach Sonny Dykes' team would shock the nation becoming the first Texas team to advance to the National Championship following a Fiesta Bowl win over the heavily favored Michigan Wolverines by a score of 51–45. They entered the National Championship with a 13–1 record, winning all nine games and losing none in conference play. Hopes of a first national championship for the first time since 1938 would come to an end, as they suffered the biggest demolition in CFP history. Georgia would score a whopping 65 points on the Horned Frogs, with quarterback Stetson Bennett scoring four touchdowns and gaining 304 yards as the Bulldogs completed a perfect 15–0 season and were back-to-back national champions for the first time since the college football playoff system was instituted in 2014.

Association football
 Kashima Antlers (1993 J.League) Prior to joining the J.League as a founding member, the then named Sumitomo Metals FC was said by a board member of the JSL that they had an almost impossible chance of joining the J.League, but the combination of signing the legendary Brazilian player Zico, and Kashima approving a soccer specific stadium for the club, this impossible chance turned into reality. They won the Suntory Series (1st stage of the league), but lost the finals to NICOS Series (2nd stage) winners Verdy Kawasaki, 3–1 on aggregate, after a draw in the second game. However, their first piece of silverware, the 1996 title, would swing the floodgates wide open, and began the dominant era for Kashima Antlers, going on to be remembered as Japan's greatest professional soccer team.
 Adelaide United (2008 AFC Champions League) Adelaide United became the first Australian club to reach the knockout round of the AFC Champions League. In the quarter finals they defeated the heavily favoured Japanese champions Kashima Antlers. They then beat Uzbekistani champions FC Bunyodkor in the semi finals, before eventually being beaten in the final by Japanese club Gamba Osaka.
 Real Madrid Castilla (1979–80 Copa del Rey) Castilla reached the final of the 1979–80 Copa del Rey. During their cup run, they beat four Primera División teams, including Hércules, Athletic Bilbao, Real Sociedad and Sporting de Gijón. The latter two eventually finished second and third in the Primera División. In the final, they played Real Madrid but lost 6–1. Because Real also won the Primera División, however, Castilla qualified for the 1980–81 European Cup Winners' Cup. Despite beating West Ham United 3–1 in the opening game at the Santiago Bernabéu, they lost the return 5–1 after extra time and went out in the first round.
 Calais RUFC (1999–2000 Coupe de France)
 Deportivo Alavés (2000–01 UEFA Cup)
 Associação Desportiva São Caetano – (2000 Brazilian national championship, 2001 and 2002) In 2000, the Brazilian national championship was contested in a rather unusual way. According to previous credentials, teams would play in the First (best teams), Second or Third Division; São Caetano played in the Second. The difference was that, after all Divisions were finished, a mini tournament would gather representatives from all of them. São Caetano was runner-up of the Second Division and eventually they entered the final against Vasco da Gama. The first match ended as a draw. During the second, the match was suspended due to security concerns. Vasco petitioned the league for a third match, which Vasco went on to win. São Caetano had another strong campaign in 2001, they reached the final against Atlético Paranaense. Once again losing the championship. In 2002, São Caetano was finalist of Copa Libertadores losing the final to Olimpia of Paraguay on penalties.
 A.S. Monaco (2003–04 UEFA Champions League) – The side based in Monaco and representing the French Football Association were qualified for the group stage where they faced against the Spanish minnows, Deportivo La Coruña, PSV Eindhoven and AEK Athens in group B. With being finished second of the group, they advanced to the quarterfinals by beating the Russian side, Lokomotiv Moscow with an away goal despite being tied 2–2 on aggregate. As they lost to Real Madrid on the road at the first leg, 4–2, they came back from the death on the second leg at home by winning 3–1, thanks to Ludovic Giuly's game-winning goal to pull off the upset against the Spanish giants and send them to the semifinal where they defeated Chelsea in the next round, 5–3 to pull off the another upset in the competition. However, they lost to the eventual winners, Porto, 3–0 in the final. This marked the first team from Monaco to reach the European Cup final and the second French team to do so since Marseille who won the first title under the Champions League era in 1993.
 Bradford City (2012–13 Football League Cup) – Bradford City, then in League Two, knocked out three Premier League sides, Wigan Athletic in the fourth round, Arsenal in the fifth round and Aston Villa in the semi final. However, they lost the final 5–0 to Swansea City.
 Vegalta Sendai (2011 J.League Division 1) Following the 2011 Tohoku earthquake and tsunami, and with the club being said to be relegation favorites, Vegalta went for 11 straight wins, the first being a win at the Todoroki Athletics Stadium against Kawasaki Frontale, in which they put up a Japanese banner that said that they would "never lose a game until their town was rebuilt", which ended in a 1–0 loss to Shimizu S-Pulse, then the worst happened, when they went 9 straight games, which either ended with a loss or a draw, plummeting the club to 10th from 2nd, but they rebounded, winning 13 of their last 14 games to finish 4th. They would improve the following year, but lost out the championship to Sanfrecce Hiroshima, after losing a game to Albirex Niigata.
 Club Atlético Tigre (2008 Apertura, 2012 Clausura and 2012 Copa Sudamericana) – For the 2008 Apertura, Tigre was one goal away from becoming champion, but finished runner-up again. The club finished with a total of 39 points, tied for first place along with San Lorenzo and Boca Juniors, but ends as runner-up after playing a historic triangular final. It must be considered that the AFA modified, in the midst of their dispute, the rules of this tournament. Originally it had established that in the event of a tie for first place, the champion would be decided according to head-to-head results between the teams occupying that place. Tigre defeated San Lorenzo and Boca Juniors, both as visitors, so it was appropriate to award the club the title. However, with the imposed modification, the triangular had to be disputed. In 2012 Clausura the club was runner-up in the Primera Division again. Tigre started the season thinking about not being in the relegation table, but ended up exceeding the expectations by fighting for the league title until the last date. At the end of that same year, after eliminating Colombian side Millonarios in the semifinals of the 2012 Copa Sudamericana, it reached its first international final in its history, where the club lost to São Paulo in the finals.
 Atlético Madrid (2013–14 UEFA Champions League) – Under the second year under Diego Simeone, they were drawn group G against the Russia's Zenit St. Petersburg, 2-time titleholders, FC Porto and Austria Wien after finishing third at last season's La Liga behind their rivals, FC Barcelona and Real Madrid. With being finished on the top of the group, they managed to take a 1–0 lead on the road against AC Milan in the first leg of the round of 16 and then thrashed 4–1 at home on the second leg to pull off the upset against 7-time European champions to clinch to the quarterfinals against their Spanish rivals, Barcelona. However, they were drawn at Camp Nou, 1–1 in the first leg, and surged the comeback against Lionel Messi and company at home, 1–0 on the second leg to send his side to the semifinal for the first time since 1974 against Chelsea. Despite with a goalless draw in Stamford Bridge in the first leg, they finished the game, 3–1 to pull off the another upset of the competition on the second leg to send them to the first European Cup final under his managerial career. Unfortunately in the final, they lost 4–1 after the extra time despite they managed a 1–0 lead against their crosstown rivals, Real Madrid with minutes away from lifting the European Cup. This achievement marked the first European Cup final appearance since 1974 against Bayern Munich.
 Querétaro (Clausura 2015)
 Liverpool (2017–18 UEFA Champions League) – After 13 years of the miraculous triumph in Istanbul, Liverpool qualified for the Champions League for the first time in five seasons through finishing fourth in the 2016–17 Premier League, a point ahead of Arsenal. After overcoming TSG 1899 Hoffenheim in the play-off round, the Reds advanced to the group stage, where they were drawn into Group E. After back to back draws with Sevilla and FC Spartak Moscow, they got ten points from their remaining four matches to seal top spot in the group, which includes two 7–0 wins over Spartak and NK Maribor. In the knockout stage, they first trounced FC Porto with a 5–0 win in the round of 16. They were then drawn against a Manchester City side which resoundingly won the 2017–18 Premier League with 100 points, being the underdogs despite a 4–3 home win against them earlier in the season. However, a 3–0 home win and a 2–1 away win followed, which sent them into the semi finals 5–1 on aggregate. After grinding out a 7–6 aggregate win over A.S. Roma in the semi finals, the Reds lost the final 3–1 to the defending champions Real Madrid after an injury to Egyptian winger Mohamed Salah, and two goalkeeping errors by Loris Karius.
 Les Herbiers VF (2017–18 Coupe de France) – On 17 April 2018, Les Herbiers defeated fellow third-division side Chambly to reach the final of the Coupe de France. Les Herbiers upset second-division Lens in the quarterfinals and Auxerre in the round of 16 en route to the final, making their run to the final without facing a first-division team. Les Herbiers lost the final 2–0 to Paris Saint-Germain on 8 May 2018.
 Vietnam U-23 (2018 AFC U-23 Championship)
 Tajikistan U-16 (2018 AFC U-16 Championship)
 Croatia (2018 FIFA World Cup) – Despite a poor showing in their friendly matches, Croatia began their 2018 World Cup campaign by going undefeated in the 3-game group stage against Nigeria, Argentina and Iceland. Although it had been twenty years since the team ever won a knockout match in a World Cup, the Croatians defeated the Danish and the hosting Russians with back-to-back shootout wins, an unprecedented accomplishment, to reach the semifinals against England, which they also defeated in overtime. After having to win three straight matches beyond regulation in the knockout stage, the Croatians came up short in the finals against the French, in a 4–2 defeat. It was the Croatians' first time making the finals since the nation's breakup from Yugoslavia in 1992.
 England (2020 UEFA European Championship) – England have been waited 54 years to reach the tournament final since the greatest triumph in the old Wembley in 1966 while the Wembley's curse still lies in the England national team despite they had the star players coming from Premier League and the other domestic leagues elsewhere as the UEFA Euro finals moved to 2021 due to the COVID-19 pandemic. The Englishmen began the European journey in the new Wembley Stadium on the group D against the Croatians who defeated them 4 years ago in Russia in the semi-final, Scots and the Czechs as Raheem Sterling scored for England to pay the huge revenge against Croatia in the opener, 1–0. As they reach the top of the group D, they were drawn against the British arch-rival, Scotland in the second game of the group where both sides did not score the goals to share the points between them at the Euro 2020 final venue and then, Sterling scored again against Czech Republic on the 12th minute in the group D's finale as they reached to the knockout stage. During the round of 16, there were doubts of beating their archnemesis, Germany at their own turf due to the Gareth Southgate's tactical problems and their doubts erased after Sterling and Kane both scored to pull the knockout punch against the Germans and punch their ticket to Rome against Ukraine at the quarter-final where Harry Maguire and Jordan Henderson scored their first ever UEFA Euro goals away from home as England beat them, 3–0. On their return to Wembley however in the semi-final, England were down 0–1 against the competition's minnows, Denmark at home after Mikael Damsgaard's free kick towards the Pickford's net and the hopes gave to them after Kjaer's own goal for seeking the end of the tunnel to reach the tournament's final before heading to the extra time. As the extra time beckoned, Danes brought Sterling down in the penalty box to signal the penalty for England to avoid upset. To pull out the knockout blow, Kane's shot fell through by the hands of Kasper Schmeichel but followed in to get the ball inside the net to retake the lead at the brand new Wembley Stadium at the first extra time. After grueling 15 minutes of extra time, England finally reached to the tournament final after the 54 years of long wait without any single tournament final appearances and this time they would be facing Italy who went wire-to-wire during the 2020 Euro finals before reaching the pinnacle of the European football, but their Cinderella journey ended by the penalty shoot-out as the Italians won the second European title since 1968, 3-2 after a 1–1 draw.
 Oita Trinita (2021 Emperor's Cup) – Oita Trinita, who had a rollercoaster in the 2010s, going from J.League Cup champions in 2008, to relegation to J2 in 2009, then promotion to J1 again in 2010, then relegation to J3 by 2016, and all the way to J1 again by 2019, entered the 2021 Emperor's Cup in the second round as one of 21 J1 clubs of that season. They won their first matchup against Honda Lock SC, 3–2, in extra time, then shut out Fukui United FC, 2–0. In the fourth round, they defeated J2 club Thespakusatsu Gunma, 2–1, in extra time. They proceeded to defeat fellow J1 club Júbilo Iwata in the quarterfinal stage, 2–0. Their toughest challenge was to follow, going into the semifinals against defending champions Kawasaki Frontale. But in the midst of that, just 1 week before their semis matchup, they were confirmed to be relegated to J2 for 2022, finishing 18th that season. Unbelievably, against all odds, Trinita defeated Frontale, 4–5 on penalty shootout after the game was tied, 1-1. They would make their first Emperor's Cup Final in club history, but lost, 2–1 against Urawa Red Diamonds.
 Union Saint-Gilloise (2021-2022 Belgian First Division A) – Under the management of Felipe Mazzu, Saint-Gilles managed to promote to the Belgian First Division after the 20–21 season. Immediately the newcomers won their first matches, becoming unexpected leaders in points. Since then, they never left first place and are expected to end the classical part of the competition as winners and however, they lost to Club Brugge in the play-off final to end their Cinderella run for being conceded by two goals.
 Morocco (2022 FIFA World Cup) – Morocco played to a scoreless draw with Croatia, the defending World Cup runner-ups, to begin their 2022 World Cup group stage. The Atlas Lions then defeated Belgium and Canada by respective 2–0 and 2–1 scores to advance to the knockout stage. After playing to a scoreless draw after 90 minutes of regulation time and 30 minutes of extra time to begin the knockout stage, Morocco shut out Spain 3–0 in the penalty shootout. The Moroccans then upset Portugal 1–0 in the quarterfinals before losing to the defending World Cup champions France 2–0, setting up a rematch with Croatia for third place, ultimately losing 2–1.

Australian rules football
 Greater Western Sydney Giants (2019) – The Giants, who finished with the worst regular season record in the AFL during the first two seasons of its existence, qualified for the finals series after finishing sixth in the regular season standings with a record of 13–9. The team had never been to the Grand Final throughout its existence, as it had lost two preliminary finals in the previous three seasons. However, they upset Collingwood in the preliminary final to advance to the Grand Final for the first time in the franchise's history. After having to win two straight matches on the road (against the Brisbane Lions and Collingwood) by less than five points, the Giants lost to Richmond by 89 points in the 2019 AFL Grand Final (who had won their second premiership in three years).

Baseball

Major League Baseball
 1995 Seattle Mariners – The Mariners, who had never made the playoffs previously in their 19-season history, were just 51–50 and trailed the California Angels by 12.5 games at the conclusion of play on August 15. Off the field, their ineptitude found them struggling to find support for a new stadium to replace the aging Kingdome, which made relocation seem likely. However, Seattle rallied to go 27–16 the rest of the way, finishing the season tied with California, who collapsed down the stretch, at 78–66. After easily winning the tiebreaker, Seattle trailed the best-of-5 ALDS 2–0 to the New York Yankees, but rallied to win the final 3 games at home, capped by Hall of Famer Edgar Martinez's walk-off double in the 11th inning of Game 5. However, the Cinderella ride ended in the ALCS, where the Mariners lost to the Cleveland Indians in 6 games. However, the playoff run did convince the Washington State Legislature that the team was wanted in the region, and they approved an alternative financing package for a new stadium, Safeco Field, which opened 4 years later.
 2000 Oakland Athletics – The Athletics end an eight-year postseason drought in what would begin the "Moneyball era" of the team being greatly competitive, lasting from 2000 to 2006. For 2000 the Athletics made the American League Division Series for the first time since 1992, losing to the New York Yankees.
 2005 Houston Astros – After suffering decades of mediocrity and misfortune, including a gut-wrenching losses in the 1980, 1986, and 2004 NLCS, the Astros finally won their first pennant in 2005. Despite starting the season 15-30 and 5th in the NL Central, they went on a 74–43 run and finished the season 89-73 and qualified for the Postseason as the NL Wild Card. They beat the Atlanta Braves in the NLDS on a walk-off home run by Chris Burke in an 18-inning classic Game 4. They then got revenge on the St. Louis Cardinals in the NLCS. Their Cinderella run sadly ended when they were swept by the White Sox in the World Series. This was their last Postseason appearance as a National League team and they wouldn't return to the postseason until 2015, and wouldn't win another Pennant until their first World Series championship in 2017.
 2007 Colorado Rockies – On September 16, 2007, the Rockies possessed a win–loss record of 76–72 and were 4 1/2 games out of the NL Wild Card. However, Colorado went on a hot streak, winning 13 of their last 14 games of the season to force a one-game playoff for the wild card berth, which they won by a score of 9–8 in 13 innings against the San Diego Padres. Back-to-back sweeps of the Philadelphia Phillies in the NLDS and the Arizona Diamondbacks in the NLCS gave the Rockies their first ever pennant. However, the team's fortune then ended, as they were swept in the World Series by the Boston Red Sox.
 2008 Tampa Bay Rays – The Rays were the long-time doormats of the American League East, having lost at least 91 games in each of their 10 years of existence. They went on to defeat the Chicago White Sox in the ALDS and the Boston Red Sox in a seven-game ALCS, but lost the World Series in five games to the Philadelphia Phillies—the city of Philadelphia had a championship after 25 years.
 2014 Kansas City Royals – The Royals, who had not qualified for the postseason since 1985, won the AL Wild Card Game against the Oakland Athletics through two late-inning comebacks to advance to the ALDS. From there, they swept the Los Angeles Angels (which featured American League MVP Mike Trout) and the Baltimore Orioles in the ALCS to advance to play in the World Series, which they lost in seven games to the San Francisco Giants.
 2015 Toronto Blue Jays - The Blue Jays had not reached the Postseason since 1993, when they defeated the Philadelphia Phillies in the World Series. Since then, they had never won more than 88 games in a season and had only finished second in their division once. Despite boasting a talented roster in 2015, they struggled through the first half of the season, with a mediocre 45–46 record heading into the All-Star Break. On July 28 they pulled off a blockbuster trade with Colorado, adding shortstop Troy Tulowitzki and pitcher LaTroy Hawkins to their roster. A few days later they acquired pitcher David Price from the Tigers, and later traded for Mark Lowe and Ben Revere before the trade deadline. These improvements to their already talented roster spurred the Blue Jays to a 48-23 finish, ending the regular season atop the AL East with a 93–69 record and clinching their first Postseason berth in 21 seasons. They faced the Texas Rangers in the division series and fell behind two games to none. They rallied to force a winner-takes-all Game 5 and thanks to a 3-run home run hit by Jose Bautista in the seventh inning, completed the comeback to return to the championship series, facing the Kansas City Royals. They lost the series 4 games to 2, ending their dramatic Postseason run.
 2019 New York Yankees – The Yankees, who had not won a division title since 2012, and a championship since 2009, set an MLB record for most players put on the injured list in one season. Despite that, they still finished with a 103–59 record, clinching the AL East for the first time in 7 years. They went on to sweep the Minnesota Twins in the division series before losing to the Houston Astros in the ALCS in a dramatic Game 6 by way of a Jose Altuve walk-off home run. They also become just the second team in MLB History to hit 300 home runs in a season, joining that year's Twins.
 2020 San Diego Padres – The Padres entered the season having not made the postseason since 2006 or having finished with a winning record since 2010. Thanks to the emergence of young star shortstop Fernando Tatis, Jr., pitcher Dinelson Lamet and center fielder Trent Grisham, the re-emergence of once face of the franchise Wil Myers, as well as some free agents from prior years Manny Machado and Eric Hosmer starting to play up to their contracts, the Padres finished the pandemic-shortened season at 37–23, qualifying for the playoffs as the NL West runner-up. After losing Game 1 of the NL Wild Card Series to the St. Louis Cardinals, the Padres rallied from a 6–2 deficit in Game 2 thanks to home runs from Tatis, Machado and Myers, and then won the winner-take-all Game 3 4–0. However, injuries to Lamet and fellow pitcher Mike Clevinger ultimately did the Padres in, as they were swept by their division rival and eventual World Series champion Los Angeles Dodgers in 3 games in the NLDS.
 2020 Houston Astros – The Astros began the COVID-shortened 2020 season on the heels of a highly publicized sign stealing scandal that resulted in the gutting of their entire leadership structure, with firings of general manager Jeff Luhnow and manager A. J. Hinch as well as other members of the front office. They were also fined and stripped of certain draft picks, while the players felt a season-long onslaught from the media and angry fans. Then, just one game into the season, following his six-inning winning appearance on Opening Day, ace Justin Verlander injured his right forearm, placing him out indefinitely and later necessitating Tommy John surgery. This meant he was ultimately ruled out for not just the entire season, but for all of the next year. Additionally, sophomore phenom and 2019 Rookie of the Year designated hitter Yordan Alvarez was ruled out for the season after a late start and only nine plate appearances. This proved to be a devastating blow to their batting lineup. Late starts to the season by other key players (especially members of the pitching rotation and bullpen) like José Urquidy due to COVID protocols and travel restrictions caused the Astros roster to be decimated for the vast majority of the season. As a result, first-year manager Dusty Baker shepherded them through the 60-game abbreviated season with a 29–31 record, by far their worst showing throughout their recent history as a perennial powerhouse. Then, during the postseason, they flipped a switch and instantly caught fire, sweeping the No. 3 seed Minnesota Twins in the newly added Wild Card round before easily dispatching their No. 2 seeded rival and AL West champion Oakland Athletics in four games in the divisional series. In the 2020 ALCS, the Astros went down three games to none against the No. 1 seeded Tampa Bay Rays, before thundering back with three dramatic victories in a row to tie the series at 3–3. Ultimately, the Astros lost a close and competitive Game 7 by a score of 4–2 after coming within a late-inning hit of tying the game after having initially been down 4–0. This prevented the Astros from advancing to their third World Series in four years, in what would have been a vaunted re-match of the 2017 World Series with their arch-nemesis Los Angeles Dodgers. Regardless, what amounted to a mediocre regular season quickly turned into the Astros' fourth consecutive league championship appearance, a franchise record, and one of the most exciting come-from-behind postseason upset campaigns in recent memory. This also marked the furthest any MLB team with a losing regular season record has advanced in the playoffs.
 2021 San Francisco Giants – The Giants came out of nowhere to finish with the best record in baseball at 107–55, even better than the Dodgers. However, they lost to the Dodgers in the 2021 NLDS, which ended in a controversial check swing strike call by 1st base umpire Gabe Morales.
 2022 San Diego Padres – The Padres finished the regular season with 89 wins, good enough for the National League's #5 seed in the postseason. In the wild card series, San Diego defeated the #4 seed New York Mets on the road in three games. The Padres then upset the 111-win Los Angeles Dodgers in four games in the NL Divisional series. However, the Padres' run ended with the NL Championship series loss to the #6 seed Philadelphia Phillies in five games.
 2022 Philadelphia Phillies – The Phillies started off their 2022 campaign on a bad note, thanks to multiple injuries, and poor team defense. They ultimately fired manager Joe Girardi after a 22–29 start to the season. Rob Thomson, who was named the team's interim manager, would serve well for the club, leading them to an impressive 65-46 finish. With the expanded playoffs starting in the 2022 Major League Baseball season, the Phillies were able to clinch a #6 seed in the National League, with an 87–75 record (.537 win percentage). The Phillies were also the final team to clinch a playoff berth that season, becoming the 3rd wild card team. The Phillies punched their ticket back to the postseason for the first time since 2011. They went on to sweep the 93-win, NL Central division winning St. Louis Cardinals, 2 games to none in the NL Wild Card Series, highlighted by scoring six runs after trailing 2–0 in the ninth inning of Game 1, and Zach Wheeler and Aaron Nola combining for 13 scoreless innings pitched in the two games. They then moved on to face the defending World Series champions, the Atlanta Braves, who clinched the 2nd seed in the National League. The Braves, who were attempting to repeat as World Series champions, were stunned by the Phillies in 4 games, highlighted by the Phillies routing the Braves a combined 17–4 in Games 3 & 4 in Philadelphia. In the NLCS, they were met by the 89-win San Diego Padres, who had previously put on a Cinderella run of their own to that point, in taking down the 101-win New York Mets, and 111-win Los Angeles Dodgers, respectively. The Phillies would go on to beat the Padres in 5 games, capped off by Bryce Harper hitting a go-ahead two-run home run in the bottom of the eighth inning of Game 5, clinching their first NL-Pennant win since 2009. With their pennant win secured, Rob Thomson became the first Canadian born and raised manager to lead a Major League Baseball team to the World Series. In the  World Series, the Phillies would face the 106-win Houston Astros, in the, attempting to win their first title since 2008, and their 3rd in franchise history. In game 1, the Astros jumped out to a 5 to nothing lead, thanks to two home runs from Astros’ outfielder Kyle Tucker, but managed to tie the game in the fifth inning, thanks to an implosion by Astros ace Justin Verlander. The game would remain tied entering the bottom of the ninth inning with the Houston having the winning run at second and two outs, Nick Castellanos made a game-saving catch to send the game into extra innings. In the 10th inning, Phillies catcher J.T. Realmuto hit a solo shot to help the Phillies take game one in Houston. The Astros tied the series in game 2, sending the teams back to Philadelphia for games 3, 4 and 5. In game 3, the Phillies set a World Series record, by hitting 5 home runs in one game, helping to lead the team to a 7–0 win, and to retake the series lead at 2–1. In game 4, another World Series record was set, as Astros starter Cristian Javier, and the Houston bullpen combined to throw only the second no-hitter in World Series history, and the first combined-no hitter ever. Their 5–0 game 4 win would again tie the series at 2-2. Game 5 was a close one, but the Astros edged out the Phillies, thanks in part to a huge game saving catch by Astros center fielder Chas McCormick, to and to give the Astros their first lead of the series (3-2), heading back to Houston. Verlander, at 39 years old earned his first career World Series win, becoming the oldest starter do so in game 5. In game 6, the Phillies jumped out to a 1–0 lead in the top of the 6th inning, from a solo shot by Kyle Schwarber. However, Yordan Álvarez hit a clutch 3-run home run in the bottom half of the 6th. The Astros never looked back, as the bullpen shut down the Phillies bats, holding their offense to only 3 hits. The Astros won the game 6, 4–1, and clinched their second World Series title in franchise history.

College
 Stony Brook Seawolves (2012) – The Seawolves, in just their 12th season as a Division I program, won the Coral Gables Regional as a four seed by beating host Miami (FL), Missouri State, and UCF to advance to the Baton Rouge Super Regional, where they upset the LSU Tigers, whose pitching rotation was led by future top-ten draft picks Aaron Nola and Kevin Gausman, in a three-game road series in order to advance to the 2012 College World Series. The Seawolves became the third four seed in NCAA history to win a regional, and the second regional-four seed to reach the College World Series after Fresno State. They became the first team from the America East Conference to reach the College World Series, and were also the first team from New York to do so since St. John's in 1980, as well as the first Northeast school since 1986. In the College World Series, the Seawolves lost 9–1 to UCLA and 12–2 to Florida State, ending their miracle season.

Nippon Professional Baseball 
 Osaka Kintetsu Buffaloes (2001) – The Kintetsu Buffaloes constantly finished in last place the 90s, and entered 2001 with low expectations. However, Kintetsu surprised everyone by finishing in 1st, going 78-60-2. In a game against the Orix BlueWave in which if Kintetsu won, would secure the Buffaloes the pennant. If they lost, they still had to face the Fukuoka Daiei Hawks, who earlier beat the Seibu Lions in a tiebreaker game, 9–0. They were behind 5–2 at the bottom of the 9th, but pinch hitter Hirotoshi Kitagawa became a hero, hitting a grand slam walk-off home run, erasing a 3-run deficit. They were led by Tuffy Rhodes and Norihiro Nakamura, who both became a deadly hitting tandem. Rhodes hit 55 home runs that season, tying Sadaharu Oh's record. Meanwhile, Nakamura hit 46 home runs of his own. They also had Kenshi Kawaguchi, who registered 113 hits that season. Despite their powerful offense, they were no match for the Yakult Swallows' powerful defense, which kept the offense at bay, and defeated the Buffaloes, 4–1.
 Orix Buffaloes (2021) – Having only made the playoffs twice in 2008 and 2014 during their 16 years of existence after the merger between the Osaka Kintetsu Buffaloes and Orix BlueWave, the Orix Buffaloes entered 2021 with an expected last place finish after finishing last place for two consecutive years in 2019 and 2020. However, the Buffaloes proved everyone wrong and went on a magical season, and finished in first place in Pacific League with a 70-55-18 record. In the playoffs, the Buffaloes played against the Chiba Lotte Marines, and swept them 3–0, with a tie in Game 3 that sent them to the Japan Series. Even with a star pitcher rotation, in Pacific League MVP Yoshinobu Yamamoto, Taisuke Yamaoka, and Rookie of the Year Hiroya Miyagi, star outfielder Masataka Yoshida, and foreigner Adam Jones, who helped the Buffaloes stave off elimination in Game 5, they still fell to the Tokyo Yakult Swallows, 4–2.
 Hanshin Tigers (2022) – The Tigers initially began the 2022 season with 9 straight losses, and everyone expected that they would not fight for a Climax Series spot. However, by the end of the regular season, the Tigers were already in a fight for 3rd place against the Carp and Giants. They secured the 3rd-place finish after a Giants loss to the Yokohama DeNA BayStars. They would face the BayStars in the First Stage, all on the road, defeating them in 3 games, 2–1. Their run would end after getting swept by the Tokyo Yakult Swallows, 4–0, in the Final Stage.

Basketball

College
 Louisiana State University (1985–86) – The LSU Tigers struggled heavily with a number of obstacles during that season. Future NBA player Tito Horford was dismissed from the team, Zoran Jovanović suffered a season-ending knee injury during the Christmas break, and three additional players were declared academically ineligible. Even worse, a chickenpox outbreak plagued the team, with star forward John Williams and backup forward Bernard Woodside hospitalized for a week and the team quarantined for several days. Nevertheless, LSU barely sneaked into the NCAA Tournament as an 11 seed in the southeast region. Following upsets of six-seeded Purdue in double overtime and third-seeded Memphis State at LSU's Assembly Center, the Tigers then stunned second-seeded Georgia Tech by a score of 70–64 at the Omni Coliseum in Atlanta, located a few miles away from Tech's campus. In the Elite Eight, LSU finally prevailed over top-seeded Kentucky for the first time in four meetings that season, edging the Wildcats 59–57 and becoming the first ever 11 seed to advance to the Final Four. The Tigers' unlikely tournament run ended with an 88–77 loss to the eventual national champion Louisville Cardinals.
 Loyola Marymount University (1989–90) – After averaging an NCAA record 122 points per game, the Lions lost senior leader, and former scoring and rebounding champion, Hank Gathers, to a heart condition as he died on the court. However, the Lions fought their way to the Elite Eight where they lost to the eventual champion UNLV Rebels. Their run included defeating defending national champion Michigan 149–115.
 George Mason University (2005–06) – The Patriots entered the tournament as an 11 seed, after not having a guaranteed spot following a loss to Hofstra in the CAA Tournament. Subsequently, many critics believed the Patriots should have been excluded from the tournament. However, the Patriots would go on to not only prove the critics wrong, but also capture the attention of a nation. In the first round, George Mason dispatched the Michigan State Spartans by a score of 75–65. Following their improbable win, the Patriots would continue their journey by downing the defending national champion, North Carolina Tar Heels, 65–60. The Patriots, having already made history in their first Sweet 16 appearance, would follow that up with a shocking victory over potential Cinderella story Wichita State Shockers, 63–55. Having once again triumphed, the stage was set for the Patriots toughest test yet, the top-seeded Connecticut Huskies. The Huskies, led by Rudy Gay, had a total of 5 players soon to be taken in the 2006 NBA draft. Regardless of the odds stacked against them, the Patriots were able to withstand the test and emerge with an 86–84 victory, concluding a thrilling overtime. Having once again made history, the Patriots became just the second 11 seed to advance to the Final Four, where they lost to the eventual national champion Florida Gators, 73–58.
 University of North Carolina (2009–10) – After winning the 2009 NCAA Division I men's basketball tournament, the Tar Heels were poised to make another run at an NCAA championship title in the 2009–10 college basketball season. The team played inconsistently throughout the season and were not selected to enter the 2010 NCAA Tournament due to them finishing with a losing record in conference play. UNC were instead invited to play in the 2010 National Invitation Tournament; they won four straight games to advance to the NIT championship game, where they would lose to the Dayton Flyers.
 Virginia Commonwealth University (2010–11) – The 11th-seeded Rams, who had to play in the First Four, made it to the Final Four for the first time in school history, with a shocking victory against number-one seed Kansas 71–61 in the regional finals. Their run came to an end with a loss to the 8th-seeded Butler Bulldogs in the national semifinals 70–62.
 Butler University (2010–11) – Looking for another Final Four appearance after last year, the Bulldogs made it into the tournament as an 8 seed. After a buzzer-beater to win the first round matchup against Old Dominion 60–58, the Bulldogs upset number-one seed Pittsburgh 71–70 to move on to the Sweet Sixteen. They later went on to defeat No. 4 Wisconsin and No. 2 Florida to make it into the Final Four for the second straight year. They dismantled another Cinderella team, aforementioned VCU, in the national semifinals to advance on to the national championship game. However, the Connecticut Huskies put an end to Butler's tournament run 53–41, denying the Bulldogs the national title again one year after the loss to Duke in the 2010 championship game.
 Florida Gulf Coast University (2012–13) – After they defeated Mercer in the Atlantic Sun tournament, the Eagles made their first ever appearance in the 2013 NCAA Division I men's basketball tournament as a 15 seed. Nicknamed the "Dunk City", the Eagles upset No. 2 Georgetown and defeated No. 7 San Diego State to advance on to the Sweet Sixteen, becoming the first 15-seed to do so. Their tournament run later came to an end with a loss to No. 3 Florida 62–50.
 Wichita State University (2012–13) – The 9th-seeded Shockers made a run to the Final Four, beating the number-one seed Gonzaga Bulldogs by a score of 76–70 in the third round and then the second-seeded Ohio State Buckeyes in the Elite Eight by a score of 70–66. With the Shockers advancing on to the Final Four, they became the first and only 9th-seeded team to reach the Final Four. They eventually lost to the first-seeded Louisville Cardinals (who ended up having their eventual championship vacated) by a score of 72–68.
 University of Dayton (2013–14) – Despite being 13–8 by the end of January, Dayton entered the 2014 NCAA Division I men's basketball tournament with a 23–10 record. In the first round, Dayton would take on 6th-seeded Ohio State, and upset them by a score of 60–59 following a game-winning shot from Vee Sanford. They would then upset 3rd-seeded Syracuse and 10th-seeded Stanford, but their run would end after losing to the Florida Gators in the Elite Eight.
 University of Kentucky (2013–14) – A year after missing the NCAA Tournament, in which they played in the NIT, the Kentucky Wildcats entered the 2014 NCAA Division I men's basketball tournament as the 8th seed. Kentucky started their tournament run with a 56–49 victory over the 9th-seeded Kansas State Wildcats. Afterwards, they would later upset the previously unbeaten Witchita State Shockers in the Round of 32 following a missed game-winning shot by Fred VanVleet. They would then defeat their archrival, the 4th-seeded Louisville Cardinals, before shooting guard Aaron Harrison made game-winning 3s to upset the Michigan Wolverines and Wisconsin Badgers in the Elite 8 and Final Four respectively. However, their tournament run ended after losing in the championship game to the 7th seeded UConn Huskies, who themselves had a Cinderalla run.
 University of Maryland, Baltimore County (2017–18) – The Retrievers became the first 16th-seeded team to win a game in the men's NCAA tournament against a number-one seed when they defeated the Virginia Cavaliers 74–54 in the first round. UMBC's remarkable run ended with a narrow 50–43 loss to 9th-seeded Kansas State in the round of 32.
 Loyola University Chicago (2017–18) – With a win against Evansville on February 18, 2018, Loyola clinched at least a share of its first-ever Missouri Valley Conference regular season championship. With a win over Southern Illinois on February 21, the Ramblers clinched the outright MVC championship. They then defeated Northern Iowa, Bradley, and Illinois State to win the MVC Tournament. The Ramblers qualified for the NCAA tournament for the first time since 1985 as the 11th seed in the South with a 28–5 record. In the first round, the Ramblers defeated No. 6 Miami 64–62. The Ramblers then upset No. 3 Tennessee 63–62, advancing to the Sweet Sixteen for the first time since 1985. Then the Ramblers defeated No. 7 Nevada 69–68, advancing to the Elite Eight for the first time since 1963. In the Elite Eight, the Ramblers defeated No. 9 Kansas State, advancing to the Final Four for the first time in program history, becoming the fourth 11th seed to do so. In the national semifinal, they lost to 3rd-seeded Michigan 69–57 after leading the game for 30 minutes.
 Auburn University (2018–19) – The Tigers entered the 2019 NCAA tournament as the 5th seed. In the tournament, the Auburn Tigers barely survived an upset bid against 12th-seeded New Mexico State before upsetting 4th-seeded Kansas, top-seeded North Carolina, and second-seeded Kentucky to advance to their first Final Four in program history. Their run ended after losing 63–62 to the top-seeded (and eventual national champion) Virginia Cavaliers.
 San Diego State University (2019–20) – The Aztecs came into the season unranked and had missed the NCAA Tournament 3 of the previous 4 years and were two years removed from the retirement of long-time coach Steve Fisher. Led by transfers Malachi Flynn, Yanni Wetzell and K.J. Feagin, as well as the further development of returnees such as Matt Mitchell, Jordan Schakel, and Nathan Mensah, the Aztecs roared to a 26–0 start and a top 5 ranking. The Aztecs were ultimately 30–2 and likely to be a 1 or 2 seed in the NCAA Tournament, with many analysts thinking the Aztecs had a chance to win the national championship. However, the NCAA tournament was canceled due to the COVID-19 pandemic.
 Oral Roberts University (2020–21) – Seeded fourth in the Summit League tournament, the Golden Eagles topped North Dakota before having upset wins over top-seeded South Dakota State and North Dakota State in the respective semifinal and championship rounds. Oral Roberts qualified to the 2021 NCAA tournament for the first time since 2008 as the 15 seed in the South with a 16–10 record. In the first round, Oral Roberts stunned No. 2 Ohio State 75–72 in overtime with Kevin Obanor and Max Abmas combining for 59 points in the victory. The Golden Eagles then defeated No. 7 Florida 81–78 in the second round, advancing to the Sweet Sixteen for the first time since 1974 and becoming the second 15 seed to do so. However, Oral Roberts was defeated by No. 3 Arkansas 72–70 in the Sweet 16.
 UCLA (2020–21) – Having lost four consecutive games, the Bruins snuck into the NCAA Tournament as the 11-seed in the East Region, and had to play in the First Four against Michigan State. UCLA overcame a 14-point deficit to beat the Spartans 86–80 in overtime. The Bruins then defeated No. 6 BYU 73–62, defeated No. 14 Abilene Christian 67–47, outlasted No. 2 Alabama 88–78 in overtime, and upset top-seeded Michigan 51–49 to become just the fifth 11-seed and the second First Four team to reach the Final Four, after VCU in 2010–2011. UCLA's Cinderella run ended with a 93–90 overtime loss to overall top-seed and undefeated Gonzaga, a game which featured 15 ties and 19 lead changes, in which the Zags' Jalen Suggs banked in a deep three-point shot to beat the overtime buzzer. This loss joined UCLA with the aforementioned VCU team as the only teams in NCAA tournament history to win five games and not qualify for the national championship game. The Final Four game is widely regarded as one of the greatest games in NCAA history.
 Saint Peter's University (2021–22) – Following a road loss to Siena that dropped Saint Peter's record to 12–11, the Peacocks, led by stars Doug Edert, KC Ndefo, Daryl Banks III, brothers Hassan and Fousseyni Drame, and fourth-year head coach Shaheen Holloway, improbably reeled off 10 consecutive wins. After winning their last four games to finish the regular season 16–11 and 14–6 in Metro Atlantic Athletic Conference play, the Peacocks, as the No. 2 seed in the MAAC tournament, defeated Fairfield, Quinnipiac, and Monmouth to win the conference's automatic bid to the 2022 NCAA tournament for the first time since 2011, receiving a No. 15 seed in the East Region. Saint Peter's began their run by upsetting No. 2 seed Kentucky 85–79 in overtime in the first round, becoming the tenth 15 seed on record to upset a No. 2 seed in the NCAA tournament. The Peacocks then became the third 15 seed to advance to the Sweet 16 after upsetting No. 7 seed Murray State 70–60, which also ended the Racers' 21-game winning streak. Then, they became the first-ever 15 seeded team to advance to the Elite Eight by stunning No. 3 seed Purdue 67–64. However, the Peacocks' magical season came to an end with a 69–49 defeat to No. 8 seed North Carolina.
 University of North Carolina (2021–22) – Following Roy Williams' retirement from coaching the previous season, North Carolina, led by first-year head coach and former Tar Heel player Hubert Davis, entered the 2022 NCAA Tournament as the 8-seed in the East Region. After routing 9-seed Marquette 95–63 in the first round, UNC ousted the top-seed and defending national champion Baylor Bears 93–86 in overtime despite blowing a 25-point lead and losing Brady Manek to an ejection as a result of his flagrant 2 foul in the second half. The Tar Heels then prevailed over 4-seed UCLA 73–66 in the Sweet 16, with Caleb Love accounting for 30 points and six made three-pointers in the win. North Carolina then ended the Cinderella run of 15-seed Saint Peter's in the Elite Eight, defeating the Peacocks 69–49 to reach the Final Four for a record 21st time. In the national semifinals, UNC defeated cross-town rival Duke for the second time in three meetings this season in an 81–77 decision and ended the college basketball coaching career of Mike Krzyzewski. However, the Tar Heels lost to the top-seed Kansas Jayhawks 72–69 in the national championship game despite leading by as many as 16 points in the first half.
 Fairleigh Dickinson University (2022–23) – Although Fairleigh Dickinson lost to Merrimack in the Northeast Conference (NEC) Tournament championship game, Merrimack was in its last season of a four-year transition period from Division II to Division I, making the Warriors ineligible for the 2023 NCAA Tournament. As a result, FDU received the conference's automatic bid, entering the tournament as the 68th and last-ranked team overall in the field. The Knights have a strength of schedule ranked 363rd and last in Division I according to KenPom.com and have a roster being the shortest overall in Division I. Despite these disadvantages, Fairleigh Dickinson played in the First Four and defeated Texas Southern 84–61, giving the Knights the No. 16 seed where they faced No. 1 seed Purdue in the first round, led by 7'4" stalwart Zach Edey. Despite Edey scoring 21 points and grabbing 15 rebounds, Fairleigh Dickinson, who closed as 23.5-point underdogs, shocked the basketball world by defeating the Boilermakers 63–58, becoming the first No. 16 seed out of the First Four to defeat a No. 1 seed in the NCAA Division I men's basketball tournament, and the second 16-seed overall after UMBC's win over Virginia in 2018. Fairleigh Dickinson made it to the round of 32 for the first time in school history and became the first Northeast Conference team to win in the round of 64. FDU's season ended with a 78–70 loss to the No. 9 seed Florida Atlantic Owls.

National Basketball Association
 1975–76 Phoenix Suns – Despite entering the NBA playoffs with only a 42–40 record, the Suns would upset the defending champion Golden State Warriors to enter the NBA Finals against the Boston Celtics. Despite giving the Celtics a triple-overtime thriller in Game 5, which the Suns lost by two points, the Suns would lose to the eventual champion Celtics 4 games to 2. That season's team was given the nickname of the "Sunderella Suns".
 1998–99 New York Knicks – The Knicks became the only eighth-seeded team to advance to play in the NBA Finals. However, New York lost to the San Antonio Spurs 4 games to 1 in the 1999 NBA Finals.
 2006–07 Golden State Warriors – After 13 years of futility, the Warriors, ending the season with a 16–5 run, finished the season with a 42–40 record, clinching the eight seed, and returning to the playoffs for the first time since the 1993–94 season. Led by Baron Davis, Matt Barnes, Monta Ellis, and head coach Don Nelson, the Warriors faced the top-seeded Dallas Mavericks led by league MVP Dirk Nowitzki. Despite being heavy underdogs, the Warriors shocked the basketball world by defeating the Mavericks in six games, becoming the third eighth-seeded team in NBA history to eliminate a first-seeded team in the playoffs, after the Denver Nuggets and New York Knicks did it in 1994, and 1999 respectively. But the first eight-seed to do so in a best-of-seven series. However, the Warriors magical run ended in the Western Conference Semifinals when they were defeated by the Utah Jazz in five games. The slogan “We Believe” became the Warriors’ slogan for the last two months of the season and throughout playoffs.
 2008–09 Orlando Magic – Just a year after winning their first playoff series since 1996 (during the Shaq/Penny era), the Magic qualified for the NBA playoffs for a second straight year. The Magic defeated the Philadelphia 76ers in six games, the defending NBA champion Boston Celtics in seven games, and the heavily favored Cleveland Cavaliers in six games to advance to play in the NBA Finals against the Los Angeles Lakers. However, the Magic lost to the Lakers in five games. The Magic were led by Dwight Howard, the top pick in the 2004 NBA draft who notably led his Magic to the Finals with no other All-Stars on the team, and was also named the NBA Defensive Player of the Year for three straight seasons.
 2010–11 Memphis Grizzlies – After years of franchise disappointment, the Grizzlies finished the 2010–11 NBA season with a win–loss record of 46–36, and qualified for the 2011 NBA playoffs as the Western Conference's number eight seed. In the playoffs, the Grizzlies won their first ever playoff series, an upset over the top-seeded San Antonio Spurs in six games. However, the Grizzlies' season ended with a hard-fought 7-game series loss to the Oklahoma City Thunder. Although they made their first ever Western Conference Finals appearance two seasons later, the Grizzlies would get swept by the San Antonio Spurs in four games.
 2015–16 Oklahoma City Thunder – Coming off an injury-plagued season last year that resulted in the Thunder failing to qualify for the NBA playoffs for the first time since the team's inaugural season in Oklahoma City (2008–09), they fired head coach Scott Brooks and hired long-time Florida Gators coach Billy Donovan as their new head coach. In Donovan's first year as head coach, he led Oklahoma City to a 55–27 record and to a Western Conference finals appearance for the fourth time in five seasons. In the NBA playoffs, the Thunder defeated the sixth seeded Dallas Mavericks in 5 games and the second seeded San Antonio Spurs in 6 games, before nearly pulling off one of the biggest upsets in the history of professional sports. Despite holding a 3 games to 1 series lead, the Thunder lost to the Golden State Warriors in the Western Conference finals in seven games. The Warriors that year had finished with the NBA's best-ever single season regular season win–loss record at 73–9, surpassing the 1995–96 Chicago Bulls' record of 72–10.
 2017–18 Boston Celtics – After losing newly acquired star players Kyrie Irving to a season-ending knee surgery and Gordon Hayward to an ankle injury in their season opener, the Celtics qualified to compete in the playoffs for a fourth consecutive year. Boston finished the 2017–18 NBA season with a win–loss record of 55–27 and qualified for the 2018 NBA playoffs as the Eastern Conference's second seed. Led by rookie Jayson Tatum and sophomore Jaylen Brown, the Celtics defeated the promising Milwaukee Bucks and Philadelphia 76ers, before losing in the Eastern Conference finals to the Cleveland Cavaliers, despite leading the series 2 games to none and then 3 games to 2, their first blown 2–0 postseason series lead in franchise history.
 2017–18 Cleveland Cavaliers – In the year following superstar Kyrie Irving's sudden departure from the team, the LeBron-led Cavs found themselves grappling to stay afloat in an increasingly-competitive Eastern Conference. The team started the season 5–7 through their first 12 games, was ranked as low as 12th in the East a month into the season, and even at the All-Star break was struggling to elevate themselves to their status of the last three years, despite having gone on a 13-game win-streak in December. At regular season end, the Cavs placed fourth in the East, several spots lower than any LeBron-led team had finished in all of his last seven consecutive trips to the Finals, meaning they were an underdog to almost half the conference's playoff field this time around. In the First Round, they defeated the No. 5 seed Indiana Pacers in seven back-and-forth games, propelled by a vintage LeBron buzzer-beater in Game 5, before proceeding to stunningly sweep the No. 1-seeded Toronto Raptors in the conference semi-finals by virtue of yet another instant-classic walk-off game-winning shot in Game 3 by James. This was the third consecutive season that Cleveland sent the Raptors home in the playoffs, and sweeping them in four games for the second year in a row. The Cavs then entered the Eastern Conference Finals firing on all cylinders more than they had at any point previously, defeating the No. 2 seed Boston Celtics in the ECF after being down both 2–0 and 3–2, with all matches except Game 7 being decided by home court advantage. With this win, after having played in and won two Game 7's, and having beaten two higher-seeded teams as historic underdogs both times, they clinched their fourth straight conference title, and advanced to the 2018 NBA Finals to face the Golden State Warriors for a record-breaking fourth consecutive season. Despite being swept in the Finals, the Cavs showed surprising fight in Game 1, taking it to overtime by way of a sensational 51-point game from LeBron James, having held a lead with just seconds remaining in the game, blown in part by a now-infamous closing-seconds blunder by J.R. Smith.
 2019–20 Miami Heat – A year after Heat legend and 3-time champion Dwyane Wade, believed by many as the best Heat player in franchise history, retired from the NBA, the Heat finished the 2019–20 season with a 44–29 record as the 5th seed in the Eastern Conference. Led by Jimmy Butler, Bam Adebayo, rookie Tyler Herro and undrafted free agent Duncan Robinson, the Heat began their playoff run by sweeping the Pacers, shockingly defeated the top-seeded and heavily favored Milwaukee Bucks in 5 games and finally beat the Celtics in 6 games to reach their 6th NBA Finals appearance in franchise history. They became the only 5th seed in NBA history to ever reach the Finals. However, the Heat were defeated in the Finals in six games by the LeBron James-led Los Angeles Lakers, who were affected by the death of Kobe Bryant in a helicopter crash that happened six weeks before the NBA suspended its season as a result of the COVID-19 pandemic; the Lakers' win in that series marked their seventeenth championship title and their first championship since 2010.
 2020–21 Atlanta Hawks – The Hawks had struggled for the past three years failing to win more than 30 games a season. After a 14–20 start, the Hawks fired head coach Lloyd Pierce and named Nate McMillan as interim head coach. McMillan alongside Trae Young, Clint Capela, and John Collins, led the Hawks on a 27–11 run to finish the season with the 5th seed with a 41–31 record, qualifying for the playoffs for the first time since the 2017 season. The Hawks began their playoff run by defeating the 4th seeded New York Knicks where Young was being consistently mocked by fans during the series. Then the Hawks upset the top seeded Philadelphia 76ers in the Conference Semifinals, where two of their victories were coming back from large deficits. The Hawks would advanced to the Eastern Conference Finals for the first time since 2015 where they faced the 3rd seeded Milwaukee Bucks. Despite a strong Game 1 victory, the Hawks would lose the series in six games.
 2020–21 Phoenix Suns – During the previous five seasons, the Suns had just a .302 winning percentage which is the worst winning percentage in the five years prior for a team advancing to the final playoff round in any of the four major American professional sports leagues. After acquiring All-Star Chris Paul from the Oklahoma City Thunder in the off-season, the Suns, led by Paul, Devin Booker, 2018 first overall pick Deandre Ayton, and second-year head coach Monty Williams, finished the season as the No 2. seed with a 51–21 record, clinching the Pacific Division for the first time since 2006–07, clinched a playoff spot since the 2009–2010 season and finished with a winning record for the first time since the 2013–14 season. The Suns began their playoff run by defeating the seventh-seeded and defending NBA champion Los Angeles Lakers in the opening round in six games. The Suns then swept the third-seeded Denver Nuggets in the conference semifinals. Then in the Conference Finals, the Suns defeated the fourth-seeded Los Angeles Clippers in the conference finals in six games, advancing to the NBA Finals for the first time since 1993. Against the Milwaukee Bucks however, the Suns would lose in six games despite starting the series 2–0.
 2021–22 Dallas Mavericks – Led by star Luka Dončić and first year head coach Jason Kidd, the Dallas Mavericks finished the regular season with a 52–30 record and clinched the 4th seed in the playoffs. The Mavericks would begin their playoff run by defeating the Utah Jazz in 6 games, their first playoff series win since the aforementioned 2010–11 championship season. They would take on the top-seeded Phoenix Suns and upset them in 7 games, including a dominant 123–90 victory at Footprint Center. However, their season ended after losing to the Golden State Warriors in 5 games.
 2021–22 Boston Celtics – After starting the season with an 18–21 record under first year head coach Ime Udoka, the Boston Celtics, led by all-stars Jayson Tatum, Jaylen Brown, Al Horford, and defensive player of the year Marcus Smart, won 33 of their next 53 games to finish the regular season 51–31 and grab the second seed in the playoffs. The Celtics started their postseason run by sweeping the Brooklyn Nets in four games. In the conference semifinals, they ousted the defending NBA champion Milwaukee Bucks in seven games. The Celtics then proceeded to defeat the top-seeded Miami Heat in seven games, advancing to the NBA Finals for the first time in 12 years. However, their season ended with a loss in the NBA Finals to the Golden State Warriors in six games.

International
 Macedonian men's national team, Eurobasket 2011 – Macedonia hadn't had any success in basketball before and were considered one of weaker teams of the tournament. In group stages they unexpectedly beat Greece, Croatia and Slovenia and advanced to playoffs. In the quarterfinal they were considered underdogs against hosts Lithuania, but they managed to defeat the Baltic team 67–65 in one of the biggest upsets of the tournament. Macedonia finished fourth with a record of 6 wins and 4 losses only losing in double digits to Spain.
 Poland men's national team, EuroBasket 2022 - Poland joined at that tournament after harsh loss in eliminations of 2023 FIBA World Cup so they fell to pre-qualifiers of EuroBasket 2025. In group stage they beat Czechia, Israel and Netherlands. In knock-out stage after beating Ukraine(94-86) they made the biggest upset of tournament, defeating a title defender Slovenia 90–87, thankfully to fourth Eurobasket triple-double made by Mateusz Ponitka Poland finished fourth with a record of 5 wins and 4 losses.

Esports

League of Legends
 Suning at the 2020 World Championship – Suning, which had posted a record of 17–5 in the first half of the 2017 LPL season, struggled to make it past the first round of the league's playoffs on certain occasions in 2018 and 2019 and failed to qualify for the World Championship in both of those years. After registering a 7–9 record in the first half of the 2020 season, Suning finished the second half with a record of 11–4 and defeated LGD Gaming 3–0 in the LPL championship to win their second title in the LPL and qualify for the World Championship for the first time in their history. Suning tied for first place with G2 Esports in Group A with a record of 4–2 and defeated G2 in the tiebreaker to have the advantage in the knockout stage, where they defeated JD Gaming 3–1 and Top Esports 3–1 to advance to the finals. Suning would lose the championship game of the tournament to Damwon Gaming 3–1.

Golf
 Tom Watson – Watson, a five-time open champion now in his late 50s, had a putt to win the 2009 Open Championship. He missed, and eventually lost the playoff to Stewart Cink.

Handball
 Poland men's national team (2007 World Men's Handball Championship)
 Montenegro women's national team (2012 Summer Olympics)
 Croatia women's national team (Women's EHF Euro 2020)

Ice hockey

College
 RIT Tigers (2009–2010) – In their fifth season of Division I play, the RIT Tigers won the Atlantic Hockey tournament, receiving their first bid to an NCAA Men's Hockey Tournament. They defeated No. 1 Denver and No. 3 University of New Hampshire in the East Regional in Albany, New York to make it to the Frozen Four. They were the only team to make it to the Frozen Four in their first NCAA tournament appearance, as well as the only Atlantic Hockey team to make it to the Frozen Four. They lost to Wisconsin in the Frozen Four semifinals.

National Hockey League
 1980–81 Minnesota North Stars – The North Stars, who finished third in the Adams Division in the 1980–81 season, qualified for the playoffs as the ninth seed. in the league. The team defeated the Boston Bruins in three games, the Buffalo Sabres in five games, and the Calgary Flames in six games to reach the finals, where they lost to the New York Islanders in five games.
 1981–82 Vancouver Canucks – The Canucks, who finished second in the Smythe Division with 77 points despite finishing in fourth place in the Campbell Conference, qualified for the playoffs as the second seed in the Smythe Division. They defeated the Calgary Flames in three games, the Los Angeles Kings in five games, and the Chicago Blackhawks in five games to advance to the finals, where they were swept in four games by the New York Islanders.
 1990–91 Minnesota North Stars – The North Stars finished the regular season 12 games under .500 but pulled off three massive upsets to advance to that year's Stanley Cup finals. The North Stars upset the Presidents' Trophy winning Chicago Blackhawks in six games in the first round of the playoffs, then pulled off another massive upset in round two by defeating the St. Louis Blues in six games. The North Stars continued that momentum by upsetting the defending Stanley Cup champion Edmonton Oilers in five games in the Campbell Conference finals to advance to the 1991 Stanley Cup Finals against the Pittsburgh Penguins. The North Stars' Cinderella run came to an end with an 8–0 game six loss, giving the Penguins their first Stanley Cup in team history.
 1993–94 Vancouver Canucks – The seventh seed in the Western Conference upset their division rival Calgary Flames in the first round in seven games after falling behind 3–1 in the series and rattled off 3 consecutive overtime wins to complete the comeback. The Canucks then upset the fourth seed Dallas Stars in the second round in five games to advance to the Western Conference finals against the Toronto Maple Leafs. They continued their momentum by upsetting the Maple Leafs in five games to advance to the 1994 Stanley Cup Finals against the New York Rangers. The Canucks fell behind 3–1 in the series to the Rangers, but won games five and six to force a seventh game in New York. Their playoff run fell one win short with a 3–2 loss in game 7, giving the New York Rangers their first Stanley Cup since 1940.
 1995–96 Florida Panthers – The 1995–96 season was the third in the NHL for the Panthers, who had been awarded as an expansion franchise in 1992. The team was composed of journeymen veterans and rookies and led by all-star goaltender John Vanbiesbrouck. The team finished in third place in the Atlantic Division during the season and qualified for the playoffs for the first time. In the playoffs, the Panthers defeated the Boston Bruins in five games, the Philadelphia Flyers in six games, and the Pittsburgh Penguins in seven games to reach the Stanley Cup Finals, where they were swept in four games by the Colorado Avalanche.
 2001–02 Carolina Hurricanes – Though the Hurricanes were seeded third as a division winner, having won the Southeast Division, they actually had the second-lowest point total (91) and the lowest win total (35) for a playoff team not only in the Eastern Conference, but also the whole NHL; only 4 points ahead of Montreal (87). However, they defeated the New Jersey Devils, the Montreal Canadiens, and the Toronto Maple Leafs, all in six games, to reach the Stanley Cup Finals for the first time, where they lost to the Detroit Red Wings in five games.
 2002–03 Mighty Ducks of Anaheim – The seventh seed in the Western Conference upset the defending Stanley Cup champion Detroit Red Wings in a 4-game sweep in the first round of the playoffs, then upset the first-seeded Dallas Stars in six games in round two. The Mighty Ducks then swept another surprising team (the Minnesota Wild) in the Western Conference finals to advance to the Stanley Cup Finals against the New Jersey Devils. The Ducks fell behind 2 games to 0 in the finals, but rebounded to win three of the next four games to force game 7. However, their Cinderella run came to an end with a 3–0 loss in game 7, giving the Devils their third Stanley Cup in team history. Jean-Sebastien Giguere would win the Conn Smythe Trophy as playoff MVP as a member of the losing team for his heroic efforts in backstopping the Ducks to the Stanley Cup Finals.
 2003–04 Calgary Flames – The sixth seed in the Western Conference, the Flames upset the third seed Vancouver Canucks in seven games in the first round of the playoffs, winning their first playoff series since 1989. The Flames then upset the Presidents' Trophy winning Detroit Red Wings in six games in round two, advancing to the Western Conference finals against the San Jose Sharks. They continued their momentum by ousting the Sharks in six games to advance to the Stanley Cup Finals against the Tampa Bay Lightning. Their playoff run fell one win short, losing 2–1 in game seven, giving the Lightning their first Stanley Cup.
 2005–06 Edmonton Oilers – The eighth seed of the Western Conference, the Oilers upset the Presidents' Trophy winning Detroit Red Wings in six games in round one of the 2006 playoffs. The Oilers then came back from a 2 games to 0 series deficit to defeat the San Jose Sharks in six games in round two. After this, Edmonton defeated the Anaheim Ducks in just five games in the Western Conference finals, becoming the first eighth-seeded team to ever advance to play in the Stanley Cup Finals, where they played the Eastern Conference champion Carolina Hurricanes. The Hurricanes won three of the first four games to take a 3 games to 1 series lead, but the Oilers won the next two to force a winner-take-all game seven in Raleigh, North Carolina. However, the Oilers' luck finally ran out and they lost the game 3–1, giving the Hurricanes their first Stanley Cup.
 2009–10 Philadelphia Flyers – The Flyers, inconsistent for much of the season and battling injuries that left them at one point starting their fourth string goaltender (Johan Backlund), qualified for the Stanley Cup playoffs in the final game of the season in a shootout win against their rival New York Rangers. As the seventh seed, the Flyers upset the New Jersey Devils in five games in the first round. In the second round, the Flyers defeated the Boston Bruins in seven games, in the process becoming only the fourth team in sports history to win a series in which they had trailed 3 games to 0 at one point. In the Eastern Conference finals, they needed just five games to defeat the eighth-seeded Montreal Canadiens, who had been on something of a Cinderella run themselves; the Canadiens had defeated the top seeded Washington Capitals and defending champion Pittsburgh Penguins. In the finals, the Flyers lost in six games to the Chicago Blackhawks, who won their first Stanley Cup in 49 years.
 2016–17 Nashville Predators – The Predators, who were dead last in the NHL's Western Conference at one point in the season, qualified for the Stanley Cup playoffs as the second wild card. As the eighth seed, they swept the top-seeded Chicago Blackhawks in the first round. They would then defeat the St. Louis Blues in six games in the second round to advance to their first conference final in franchise history, in which they took down the Anaheim Ducks in six games.
 2017–18 Vegas Golden Knights – As a new expansion team added to the NHL at the start of the 2017–18 season, composed of at least one player from each of the other 30 NHL teams, the Golden Knights were anticipated to have a very low chance to win the Stanley Cup or even reach the finals, with some even believing that they would have a dismal first season. However, Vegas unexpectedly played very well through the regular season, taking control of the Pacific Division and earning 109 points by the time the Stanley Cup playoffs began. The Golden Knights also made an improbable run to the Stanley Cup Finals, defeating the Los Angeles Kings, the San Jose Sharks and the Winnipeg Jets while losing only three games. Entering the Finals against the Washington Capitals, the Golden Knights boasted a seemingly impregnable defense, with a low goals against average and four shutouts, in part due to Marc-André Fleury's impeccable goaltending. However, such defense soon proved to be no match for the determined and potent Capitals, who overwhelmed the Golden Knights in five games, with at least three goals per game, to claim their first Stanley Cup.
 2018–19 Columbus Blue Jackets – The Columbus Blue Jackets clinched the final spot in the 2019 Stanley Cup playoffs following a 3–2 shootout win against the New York Rangers. They would finish the regular season with 47 wins and 98 points. In the playoffs, the Blue Jackets would upset the heavily favored and Presidents' Trophy winner Tampa Bay Lightning in a 4-game sweep to win their first playoff series in franchise history. However, their season ended after losing to the eventual Eastern Conference champions Boston Bruins in 6 games.
 2018–19 Carolina Hurricanes – The Hurricanes have missed the playoffs and entered a period of mediocrity since losing to the eventual Stanley Cup champion Pittsburgh Penguins in the Eastern Conference Finals. On April 4, 2019, the Hurricanes clinched a playoff berth for the first time in 10 years following a 3–1 victory against the New Jersey Devils, ending one of the longest NHL playoff droughts in history. They clinched a wild card spot and took on the defending Stanley Cup champions, the Washington Capitals, and defeated in 7 games in double overtime, becoming the fourth wild-card team to advance in the playoffs. In the second round, they would sweep the New York Islanders following a 5–2 victory in game 4, earning the franchise's first playoff sweep in a best-of-7 series. They would advance to their first Eastern Conference Finals since 2009, as they would take on the Boston Bruins. However, the Hurricanes season ended after being swept by the Bruins in 4 games.
 2019–20 Dallas Stars – The Stars, who had finished fourth in the Central Division during the previous season, were entering their second season under head coach Jim Montgomery when he was terminated from the organization in December 2019 for unprofessional behavior that was inconsistent with the team. Rick Bowness would take over as the head coach of the team; he would lead the Stars to a 4–2 win over the Nashville Predators in the Winter Classic. The victory would mark the start of a comeback run that would ultimately result in a fourth-place finish in the Western Conference standings by the time the season was curtailed due to the COVID-19 pandemic. Dallas would qualify for the playoffs as the third seed in the Western Conference after finishing third in the round-robin round. Dallas defeated the Calgary Flames in six games in the first round. In the second round against the Colorado Avalanche, the Stars held a 3–1 series lead before Colorado forced a seventh game in the series; Dallas would win the seventh game in overtime to advance to the conference finals, where they would face the Vegas Golden Knights, who won their first conference final two seasons earlier and were heavily favored to advance to the finals. Dallas would defeat Vegas in five games in the conference finals to advance to their first Stanley Cup Final since 2000, but ultimately went on to lose to the Tampa Bay Lightning in six games.
 2020–21 Montreal Canadiens – After a 9–5–4 start early in the season, Montreal fired head coach Claude Julien and assistant Kirk Muller, replacing them with assistant Dominique Ducharme.  Despite finishing 24–21–11 in the regular season, the Canadiens qualified for the Stanley Cup playoffs, clinching the fourth and final spot in the North Division.  In the playoffs, they overcame a 3–1 deficit to defeat the Toronto Maple Leafs in the first round, followed by a sweep of the Winnipeg Jets in the second round.  In the Stanley Cup Semifinals, they defeated the Vegas Golden Knights in six games to become the first Canadian team to advance to the Stanley Cup Finals since the 2010–11 Vancouver Canucks, and marking their first trip to the Stanley Cup Finals since 1993, where they were the last Canadian team to win the Stanley Cup.  However, the Canadiens would lose the Stanley Cup Finals in five games as the Tampa Bay Lightning won their second straight Stanley Cup.
 2021–22 Edmonton Oilers – A year after being swept by the Winnipeg Jets in the first round, including blowing a 4–1 lead in game 3, the Edmonton Oilers, led by Hart Trophy winners Connor McDavid and Leon Draisaitl, were expected to be Stanley Cup contenders. However, the team struggled during the first half of the season, including a 3–7–1 record in December. Following a 23–18–3 record, after which the Oilers lost to the Chicago Blackhawks, the team fired Dave Tippett as head coach and replaced him with Jay Woodcroft. In the second half of the season, the Oilers would turn their season around and go 26–9–3 down the stretch to finish the regular season with 49 wins and clinch second place in the Pacific Division. The Oilers would begin their playoff run by taking on the Los Angeles Kings, defeating them in seven games despite trailing 3–2 in the series, advancing to the second round of the playoffs for the first time since 2017. In the second round, the Oilers would then upset their rival Calgary Flames in five games following a game-winning goal in overtime from Connor McDavid to advance to their first Western Conference Finals since the aforementioned 2006 season. However, their run ended after being swept by the eventual Stanley Cup champion Colorado Avalanche, including an overtime loss in game 4.

International
 Canada Men's Olympic team 1994 – The Canadian Men's National team was seeded 8th in Lillehammer eventually finishing second losing to the Swedes in a shootout. The team in fact led in the final two minutes of the game only to have their hopes dashed. Eventually Peter Forsberg scored perhaps the most iconic shootout goal in hockey history to give the Swedes the gold in the extra rounds of the shootout.
 Slovakia (2012 World Championship) – Slovakia was coming off of unsuccessful home tournament and the untimely death of Slovak hockey legend Pavol Demitra in the 2011 Lokomotiv Yaroslavl plane crash during the year preceding the tournament. Not much was expected from the Slovak team that had not won a medal since 2003, but after barely qualifying for the playoffs as the 4th seed of their Group, they stunned Canada 4–3 in a thrilling quarterfinal, advancing to the semis for the first time since 2004. In the semifinal they defeated their biggest rival, Czech Republic 3–1 to advance to the gold medal game for the first time in 10 years. However, despite an early goal by Zdeno Chára after just 1:06 into the game, they were ultimately no match for Russia, losing to them 6–2 in a rematch of the 2002 final.
 Germany (2018 Winter Olympics) – The German ice hockey team had not won an Olympic medal since reunification; its last podium finish was in the 1976 Winter Olympics in Innsbruck, where the West German team won bronze (it had also won bronze at the 1932 Winter Olympics in Lake Placid). At the Pyeongchang Olympics, the German team would eventually make it to the gold medal match, defeating powerhouses Sweden and Canada on the way, only to settle for silver after the Olympic Athletes from Russia scored the game-winning goal in overtime for a 4–3 victory.

Motorsport
 Jackie Chan DC Racing (2017 24 Hours of Le Mans) – Into the morning, the leading LMP1 contenders were either lost to retirements or being forced to pit in to make essential repairs that ran for hours, causing them to fall out of contention; the lead fell to a No. 38 Oreca of Ho-Pin Tung, Thomas Laurent and Oliver Jarvis, a first for a less powerful and less expensive secondary class LMP2 car. The car held onto the lead until the last remaining two hours when the No. 2 Porsche of Timo Bernhard, Brendon Hartley and Earl Bamber (who had been out on the track after three and a half hours in the pits for front axle repairs) claimed the lead to the end.

Rugby league
 North Queensland Cowboys – In 2004, the North Queensland Cowboys reached the finals for the first time in their 10-year history. Finishing seventh at the end of the regular season, the Cowboys were drawn against the second-placed Bulldogs in the first week of the finals and pulled off a major upset by winning 30–22. They followed this up with a 10–0 defeat of the Brisbane Broncos on their home ground; this marked the first time the Cowboys had defeated the Broncos in their history. However their run would be ended with a close 19–16 defeat by the Sydney Roosters in the preliminary final.
 Wests Tigers – In 2005, the Wests Tigers, in just their sixth season of existence, won the premiership. They had never previously made the finals in five seasons and had been as low as 12th on the NRL ladder by the middle of the season. However, they were able to find some good form in the second half of the season to eventually finish the regular season 4th on the ladder. In their first ever finals match, the Tigers scored a big 50–6 victory over the previous year's Cinderella story, the North Queensland Cowboys. This was followed up with a 34–6 victory over the Brisbane Broncos in the second week before going on to upset the premiership favourites St. George Illawarra 20–12 in the preliminary final. This advanced the Wests Tigers to their first ever Grand Final, which was dubbed the "Battle of the Cinderellas", as their opponents were the North Queensland Cowboys who fell one game short of the decider in 2004 but went one better in 2005. The Tigers would then win the Grand Final 30–16 and complete their own Cinderella fairytale.
 Sydney Roosters – Twelve months after finishing last in 2009, and seemingly being a club in disarray on and off the field, the Sydney Roosters, under veteran coach Brian Smith, conjured one of the greatest turnarounds in recent NRL history, finishing sixth at the end of the 2010 NRL season and proceeding to reach the Grand Final, in which they had the chance to become the first team since the Western Suburbs Magpies in 1933–34 to rise from wooden spooners to premiers in the space of twelve months but lost to the St George Illawarra Dragons. Star recruit Todd Carney, who spent most of the previous year in exile after being sacked by the Canberra Raiders in 2008, won the Dally M Medal in the lead-up to that season's finals series for his outstanding comeback season.

Rugby union
 Japan (2019)

Tennis
 2008 Australian Open – The tournament was best known for the run to the final of unseeded French player Jo-Wilfried Tsonga. He reached the championship match by defeating four seeded players, including ninth seed Andy Murray and second seed Rafael Nadal. Tsonga lost the championship match to Novak Djokovic.
 2021 US Open – Teenager Leylah Fernandez defeated three top-5 players, including defending champion Naomi Osaka, fifth seed Elina Svitolina, and second seed Aryna Sabalenka, before losing to Emma Raducanu in the final.

References

Works cited

 
 
 
 
 
 

Cinderella
Terminology used in multiple sports
Sports terminology